Baruch de Spinoza or Benedictus de Spinoza (1632–1677), a highly controversial, influential and significant figure in the history of Western and Jewish thought,<ref>
 Moses Mendelssohn: "...Before the transition from the Cartesian to the Leibnizian philosophy could occur, it was necessary for someone to take the plunge into the monstrous abyss lying between them. This unhappy lot fell to Spinoza. How his fate is to be pitied! He was a sacrifice for the human intellect, but one that deserves to be decorated with flowers. Without him, philosophy would never have been able to extend its borders so far." (Philosophical Writings, 1755–77) [original in German]
 Georg Friedrich Hegel: "...It is therefore worthy of note that thought must begin by placing itself at the standpoint of Spinozism; to be a follower of Spinoza is the essential commencement of all Philosophy." (Lectures on the History of Philosophy) [original in German]
 Georg Friedrich Hegel: "...The fact is that Spinoza is made a testing-point in modern philosophy, so that it may really be said: You are either a Spinozist or not a philosopher at all." (Lectures on the History of Philosophy) [original in German]
 Friedrich Wilhelm Schelling: "...It is unquestionably the peacefulness and calm of the Spinozist system which particularly produces the idea of its depth, and which, with hidden but irresistible charm, has attracted so many minds. The Spinozist system will also always remain in a certain sense a model. A system of freedom — but with just as great contours, with the same simplicity, as a perfect counter-image (Gegenbild) of the Spinozist system — this would really be the highest system. This is why Spinozism, despite the many attacks on it, and the many supposed refutations, has never really become something truly past, never been really overcome up to now, and no one can hope to progress to the true and the complete in philosophy who has not at least once in his life lost himself in the abyss of Spinozism. [...] Spinoza in particular belongs to the immortal authors. He is great because of the sublime simplicity of his thoughts and his way of writing, great because of his distance from all scholasticism, and, on the other hand, from all false embellishment or ostentation of language." (On the History of Modern Philosophy, 1833) [original in German]
 Heinrich Heine: "...We must mention the providential man who, at the same time as Locke and Leibnitz, had educated himself in the school of Descartes, had for a long time been viewed only with scorn and hatred, and who nevertheless today is rising to exclusive supremacy in the world of intellect. I am speaking about Benedict Spinoza. One great genius shapes himself by means of another, less through assimilation than through friction." (On the History of Religion and Philosophy in Germany, 1833) [original in German]
 Moses Hess: "...Kant is erroneously viewed as the founder of German philosophy, and an ingenious poet-philosopher, Heinrich Heine, has even drawn a parallel between the different phases of the French Revolution and those of German philosophy, putting next to each other as analogous phenomena Kant and Robespierre, Fichte and Napoleon, Schelling and the Restoration, Hegel and the July [1830] Revolution. But the true founder of German philosophy – if one wishes to name a personal representative for the spirit of the age [Zeitgeist] – is none other than [the thinker] whose world view lies equally at the foundation of French social philosophy – Spinoza; and as far as Heine's analogy goes, it is only Kant and Robespierre, i.e. the religious revolution, who are analogous phenomena." (The Holy History of Mankind, 1837) [original in German]
 Ludwig Feuerbach: "Spinoza is the Moses of modern free-thinkers and materialists." (Principles of the Philosophy of the Future, 1843) [original in German]
 George Henry Lewes: "...A brave and simple man, earnestly meditating on the deepest subjects that can occupy the human race, he produced a system which will ever remain as one of the most astounding efforts of abstract speculation — a system that has been decried, for nearly two centuries, as the most iniquitous and blasphemous of human invention; and which has now, within the last sixty years, become the acknowledged parent of a whole nation's philosophy, ranking among its admirers some of the most pious and illustrious intellects of the age." (A Biographical History of Philosophy [Vol. 3 & 4], 1846)
 James Anthony Froude: "...We may deny his conclusions; we may consider his system of thought preposterous and even pernicious, but we cannot refuse him the respect which is the right of all sincere and honourable men. [...] Spinoza's influence over European thought is too great to be denied or set aside..." (1854)
 Matthew Arnold: "...His short life—a life of unbroken diligence, kindliness, and purity—was passed in seclusion. But in spite of that seclusion, in spite of the shortness of his career, in spite of the hostility of the dispensers of renown in the 18th century,—of Voltaire's disparagement and Bayle's detraction,—in spite of the repellent form which he has given to his principal work, in spite of the exterior semblance of a rigid dogmatism alien to the most essential tendencies of modern philosophy, in spite, finally, of the immense weight of disfavour cast upon him by the long-repeated charge of atheism, Spinoza's name has silently risen in importance, the man and his work have attracted a steadily increasing notice, and bid fair to become soon what they deserve to become,—in the history of modern philosophy the central point of interest." (Spinoza and the Bible, 1863)
 Ralph Waldo Emerson: "In my youth, Spinoza was a hobgoblin: now he is a saint." (1868)
 Friedrich Nietzsche: "...They [the Jews] have had the most painful history of all peoples, not without the fault of all of us, and when one owes to them the noblest man (Christ), the purest sage (Spinoza), the most powerful book, and the most effective moral law in the world." (Human, All Too Human, 1878) [original in German]
 Friedrich Engels: "...It is to the highest credit of the philosophy of the time that it did not let itself be led astray by the restricted state of contemporary natural knowledge, and that — from Spinoza down to the great French materialists — it insisted on explaining the world from the world itself and left the justification in detail to the natural science of the future." (Dialectics of Nature, 1883) [original in German]
 Thomas Henry Huxley: "...Lately I have been re-reading Spinoza (much read and little understood in my youth). But that noblest of Jews must have planted no end of germs in my brains, for I see that what I have to say is in principle what he had to say, in modern language." (Life and Letters of Thomas Henry Huxley, Macmillan & Co., 1913)
 Henri Bergson: "Every philosopher has two philosophies: his own and Spinoza's." [original in French]
 Martin Buber: "The greatest philosophical genius Judaism has given to the world, Spinoza, is the only one of the great philosophers for whom, in reality, God is the sole subject of thought;..." (Heruth: On Youth and Religion, 1919) [original in German]
 Bertrand Russell: "Of all the great modern philosophers, Spinoza is probably the most interesting in relation to human life, and is certainly the most lovable and high-minded. [...] Spinoza's philosophy, however, whether we agree with it or not, remains one of the noblest monuments of human genius," (A review of Spinoza: A Handbook to the Ethics by James Allanson Picton [London: Archibald Constable, 1907])
 Bertrand Russell: "Spinoza (1634–77) is the noblest and most lovable of the great philosophers." (A History of Western Philosophy, 1945)
 Leo Strauss: "...Neutrality toward Spinoza set in once one was able to admit that the "modern worldview," whose victory was decisively aided by Spinoza's metaphysics, does not, or does not entirely, coincide with this metaphysics. But even at this stage it was still generally maintained, and even emphasized, that among the three great Western philosophers of the seventeenth century — Descartes, Hobbes, and Spinoza — Spinoza was the most important one because, he was the most progressive one. He alone had drawn certain consequences from the foundations of modern philosophy, which became fully clarified only in the nineteenth century and which henceforth determined the general consciousness." (Das Testament Spinozas, 1932) [original in German]
 Leo Strauss: "...Modern Judaism is a synthesis between rabbinical Judaism and Spinoza." (Spinoza's Critique of Religion, 1930) [Translated from the German by Elsa M. Sinclair; New York: Schocken Books, 1965]
 Louis Althusser: "...Spinoza's philosophy introduced an unprecedented theoretical revolution in the history of philosophy, probably the greatest philosophical revolution of all time, insofar as we can regard Spinoza as Marx's only direct ancestor, from the philosophical standpoint. However, this radical revolution was the object of a massive historical repression, and Spinozist philosophy suffered much the same fate as Marxist philosophy used to and still does suffer in some countries: it served as damning evidence for a charge of ‘atheism’." (Reading Capital, 1968) [original in French]
 Gilles Deleuze: "...I consider myself a Spinozist, rather than a Leibnizian, although I owe a lot to Leibniz. In the book I'm writing at the moment, 'What is Philosophy?', I try to return to this problem of absolute immanence, and to say why Spinoza is for me the 'prince' of philosophers." (Spinoza: Expressionism in Philosophy, 1968) [Translated from the French by Martin Joughin; New York: Zone Books, 1992]
 Deleuze: "Spinoza: the absolute philosopher, whose Ethics is the foremost book on concepts." (Negotiations) [original in French]
 Deleuze & Félix Guattari: "Spinoza is the Christ of philosophers, and the greatest philosophers are hardly more than apostles who distance themselves from or draw near to this mystery." (What is Philosophy?, 1991) [original in French]
 David Ben-Gurion: "[Spinoza]—the deepest, most original thinker to emerge [from our people] from the end of the Bible to the birth of Einstein. [...] He was in a certain sense the first Zionist of the last three hundred years, [...] Through keen insight into Jewish and world history he prophesied the rebirth of the State of Israel." (1953)
 Rebecca Goldstein: "Can the seventeenth-century rationalist, who produced one of the most ambitious philosophical systems in the history of Western philosophy, be considered, by any stretch of interpretation, a Jewish thinker? Can he even be considered a Jew? Benedictus Spinoza is the greatest philosopher that the Jews ever produced, which adds a certain irony to his questionable Jewishness." (Betraying Spinoza: The Renegade Jew Who Gave Us Modernity, 2006)
 Harold Bloom: "...After expending a recent month in constantly rereading Spinoza, I find myself ambivalent toward this grandest of Jewish secular philosophers. (Wittgenstein was uneasily aware of his Jewish lineage, and reticent about it.) [...] As a teacher of reality, he practiced his own wisdom, and was surely one of the most exemplary human beings ever to have lived. [...] He was greatly cold, and coldly great; personally admirable and one of philosophy's rare saints. Read his "Ethics": it will illuminate you, but through light without heat." (The Heretic Jew, Sunday Book Review, The New York Times, 18 June 2006)
 Steven Nadler: "...What can be said is that Spinoza is, without question, one of history's most eloquent proponents of a secular, democratic society and the strongest advocate for freedom and toleration in the early modern period. [...] To the extent that we are committed to the ideal of a secular society free of ecclesiastic influence and governed by toleration, liberty, and a conception of civic virtue; and insofar as we think of true religious piety as consisting in treating other human beings with dignity and respect, and regard the Bible simply as a profound work of human literature with a universal moral message, we are the heirs of Spinoza's scandalous treatise." (A Book Forged in Hell: Spinoza's Scandalous Treatise and the Birth of the Secular Age, Princeton University Press, 2011)
 Michael N. Forster: "Just as Herder's cosmopolitanism allowed him to become very sympathetic to Judaism as a religion and cultural tradition, so it also allowed him to become a great admirer of the most important Jewish philosopher of the modern period: Spinoza. As is well known, Herder's appropriation (and modification) of the metaphysical monism of Spinoza's Ethics in God: Some Conversations (1787) played a central role in generating the forms of neo-Spinozistic metaphysical monism that later dominated German Idealism and German Romanticism. [...] Spinoza's contribution to those movements was thus far greater than has usually been realized." (Johann Gottfried Herder: Reasoning Across Disciplines, Workshop 26–29 May 2010 in Oslo, Norway)
 Marián Gálik: "The Festschrift [1932] dedicated to Spinoza may be said to be a praiseworthy international achievement. Its initiators were Germans and it appeared as a Sonderausgabe of a German newspaper. Spinoza had nothing in common with the German nation. The Germans, however, were the first to manifest serious interest in him. Their first great philosopher Leibniz went to seek his advice and his counsel; they were the only ones to invite him to lecture at their university. Even though Leibniz concealed him from the world, the Germans revealed him to the world. The generation of their greatest philosophers and poets from the second half of the 18th and the first half of the 19th centuries grew up under his influence. Goethe read him together with Charlotte von Stein, and even read him together with her in Latin. To Hegel, Spinoza was "der Mittelpunkt der modernen Philosophie"." (Two Modern Chinese Philosophers on Spinoza (Some Remarks on Sino-German Spinoza's "Festschrift)", Oriens Extremus 22[1], 1975)
 Omri Boehm: "...[T]he once-accepted assumption that Spinoza was considered a "dead dog" in Kant's day [i.e. before the break of the Pantheismusstreit] is no longer tenable. [...] Suffice it here to recall the well-known fact that Spinoza is the subject of the single longest entry in Bayle's Dictionnaire (1702). It is true that Bayle attempts to refute Spinoza (though some have doubted the sincerity of his intentions) but unlikely that so much space would be dedicated to refuting a neglected philosopher—unlikely, indeed, that Spinoza's relevance would wane once this high-profile entry had been published about him. J. Zedler's Grosses Universal Lexikon (1731–54) gives a similar impression, devoting to Spinoza a five-page discussion. Descartes, by comparison, is discussed in one page. Hume, Locke, Hobbes, and Plato are equally dealt with in one page (or less) each. D. Diderot and J. d'Alembert's Encyclopédie (1751–72) similarly dedicates to Spinoza five times more space than to most relevant thinkers in the history of philosophy. While speaking of Spinoza's metaphysics in extremely hostile terms, the Encyclopédie gives a reliable account of the Ethics definitions and axioms and discusses at length its most important demonstrations, especially E1p1–11. The Dictionnaire, the Lexikon, and the Encyclopédie were the main transmitters of Enlightenment thought. The attention they devoted to Spinoza ensured him a place at the heart of Enlightenment debate. It would be impossible for any educated reader to avoid contact with Spinoza's ideas. It would be easy for every metaphysician to get a grasp on the system of the Ethics. And it would be tempting, for every philosophically inclined thinker, to read Spinoza for themselves." (Kant and Spinoza Debating the Third Antinomy, in The Oxford Handbook of Spinoza, Oxford University Press, 2017)
 S. M. Melamed: "...Spinoza's teachings were already known outside of Holland during the final years of his life [approximately in his late 30s to early 40s]. So fast did his fame spread that at a time when no Jew could occupy an academic position in Central and Western Europe he was invited to fill the chair of philosophy in the University of Heidelberg [1673], one of the most important seats of learning of the time in Germany." (Spinoza and Buddha: Visions of a Dead God, University of Chicago Press, 1933)
</ref> has been the subject of a vast amount of literature, including both philosophical and literary works in genres as diverse as fiction and nonfiction. His life and philosophy have long attracted the attention of multidisciplinary scholarship. Along with Hugo Grotius, Jan Amos Comenius, René Descartes and Pierre Bayle, Spinoza was one of the leading intellectual figures of the Dutch Golden Age and the early Age of Enlightenment in the Dutch Republic. A highly original and systematic thinker, he exerted a profound influence on philosophy in the Age of Reason, despite his status as an outcast and his early death at the age of 44. Also, it was the 17th-century arch-rationalists like Spinoza (along with Descartes and Leibniz) who have given the "Age of Reason" its name and place in history. In Steven Nadler's words, "Of all the philosophers of the seventeenth century, perhaps none have more relevance today than Spinoza." (Stanford Encyclopedia of Philosophy, 2001–2016).

His thought was especially a vital force in the development of German philosophy (from the age of Leibniz–WolffStewart, Matthew: The Courtier and the Heretic: Leibniz, Spinoza, and the Fate of God in the Modern World. (New York: W.W. Norton & Company, 2006). Matthew Stewart (2006): "[When Leibniz and Spinoza met in The Hague in 1676] The encounter between the two greatest philosophers of the seventeenth century in fact extended over several days. From a letter Leibniz posted to the Duke of Hanover's secretary from Holland, it is possible to infer that the courtier arrived in The Hague on or before November 18 and remained for at least three days and possibly as much as one week. Leibniz later told his Parisian friend Gallois that he had conversed with Spinoza "many times and at great length"." to Lessing–Mendelssohn–Jacobi–Herder to Fichte–Schleiermacher–Hegel–SchellingHong, Han-ding: Spinoza und die deutsche Philosophie. Eine Untersuchung zur metaphysischen Wirkungsgeschichte des Spinozismus in Deutschland. (Aalen: Scientia Verlag, 1989) to Feuerbach–Hess–Marx–EngelsMorfino, Vittorio: Genealogia di un pregiudizio. L'immagine di Spinoza in Germania da Leibniz a Marx. (Hildesheim: Georg Olms Verlag AG, 2016) to NietzscheSommer, Andreas Urs (2012), 'Nietzsche's Readings on Spinoza: A Contextualist Study, Particularly on the Reception of Kuno Fischer,'. Journal of Nietzsche Studies 43(2): 156–184 to Haeckel, his philosophy was especially both an immense source of inspiration and challenge for almost every major German thinker, including both the idealistsFörster, Eckart; Melamed, Yitzhak Y. (eds.): Spinoza and German Idealism. (Cambridge: Cambridge University Press, 2012) and materialists) and culture in general (his significant influence on German literary luminaries from the age of LessingCrowther, Louise (2009), 'Freedom and Necessity: Spinoza's Impact on Lessing,'. German Life and Letters 62(4): 359–377.  to Goethe–Hölderlin–Novalis–Schlegel–Heine,Schneege, Gerhard: Zu Goethes Spinozismus. (Breslau: Druck von O. Gutsmann, 1910)Warnecke, Friedrich: Goethe, Spinoza und Jacobi. (Weimar: Hermann Böhlaus Nachfolger, 1908)Timm, Hermann: Gott und die Freiheit: Studien zur Religionsphilosophie der Goethezeit, Band 1: Die Spinozarenaissance. (Frankfurt am Main: Vittorio Klostermann, 1974)Wegenast, Margarethe: Hölderlins Spinoza-Rezeption und ihre Bedeutung für die Konzeption des "Hyperion". (Tübingen: Niemeyer, 1990) particularly the Romantics, Goethe: "For many years I did not dare look into a Latin author or at anything which evoked an image of Italy. If this happened by chance, I suffered agonies. Herder often used to say mockingly that I had learned all my Latin from Spinoza, for that was the only Latin book he had ever seen me reading. He did not realize how carefully I had to guard myself against the classics, and that it was sheer anxiety which drove me to take refuge in the abstractions of Spinoza. (Letters from Italy, 1786–88. Translated from the German by W. H. Auden and Elizabeth Mayer; New York: Penguin Books, 1995)
 Goethe: "...Happily, I had already prepared if not fully cultivated myself on this side, having in some degree appropriated the thoughts and mind of an extraordinary man, and though my study of him had been incomplete and hasty, I was yet already conscious of important influences derived from this source. This mind, which had worked upon me thus decisively, and which was destined to affect so deeply my whole mode of thinking, was Spinoza. After looking through the world in vain, to find a means of development for my strange nature, I at last fell upon the Ethics of this philosopher. Of what I read out of the work, and of what I read into it, I can give no account. Enough that I found in it a sedative for my passions, and that a free, wide view over the sensible and moral world, seemed to open before me. [...] The all-composing calmness of Spinoza was in striking contrast with my all-disturbing activity; his mathematical method was the direct opposite of my poetic humour and my way of writing, and that very precision which was thought ill-adapted to moral subjects, made me his enthusiastic disciple, his most decided worshipper." (The Autobiography of Goethe: Truth and Poetry: From My Own Life, 1848) [original in German]
 Friedrich Schlegel: Indeed, I scarcely comprehend how one can be a poet without revering and loving Spinoza and becoming completely his. Your own fantasy is rich enough for the invention of the particular: nothing is better suited to entice your fantasy, to stimulate and nourish it, than the poetic creations of other artists. But in Spinoza you find the beginning and the end of all fantasy, the universal ground on which your particularity rests — and you should welcome precisely this separation of that which is originary and eternal in fantasy from everything particular and specific. [...] And if I place so much emphasis on Spinoza, it is indeed not from any subjective preference (I have expressly omitted the objects of such a preference) or to establish him as master of a new autocracy, but because I could demonstrate by this example in a most striking and illuminating way my ideas about the value and dignity of mysticism and its relation to poetry. Because of his objectivity in this respect, I chose him as a representative of all the others. (Rede über die Mythologie, 1800)
 Heinrich Heine: "To express myself briefly, Goethe was the Spinoza of poetry. The whole of Goethe's poetry is filled with the same spirit that is wafted toward us from the writings of Spinoza. There is no doubt whatsoever that Goethe paid undivided allegiance to Spinoza's doctrine. At any rate, he occupied himself with it throughout his entire life; in the first part of his memoirs as well as in the last volume, recently published, he frankly acknowledged this. I don't remember now where I read that Herder once exploded peevishly at the constant preoccupation with Spinoza, "If Goethe would only for once pick up some other Latin book than Spinoza!" But this applies not only to Goethe; quite a number of his friends, who later became more or less well-known as poets, paid homage to pantheism in their youth, and this doctrine flourished actively in German art before it attained supremacy among us as a philosophic theory." (On the History of Religion and Philosophy in Germany, 1836) [original in German] as well as on many German-speaking Jewish cultural figures) in the eighteenth and nineteenth centuries.Wertheim, David J.: Salvation through Spinoza: A Study of Jewish Culture in Weimar Germany. (Leiden: Brill, 2011)

The birth of two influential rationalistic philosophical systems of Descartes (who spent most of his adult life in the Dutch Republic in the period 1628–1649 and despite frequent moves, he wrote all his major work during his 20-plus years in the United Provinces) and Spinoza – namely Cartesianism and Spinozism — are among the most remarkable philosophical breakthroughs of Dutch Golden Age and early modern Western thought. As Frederick C. Beiser (1987) noted, "The rise of Spinozism in the late eighteenth century is a phenomenon of no less significance than the emergence of Kantianism itself. By the beginning of the nineteenth century, Spinoza's philosophy had become the main competitor to Kant's, and only Spinoza had as many admirers or adherents as Kant." And in own words of Karl Marx and Friedrich Engels, "Spinozism dominated the eighteenth century both in its later French variety, which made matter into substance, and in deism, which conferred on matter a more spiritual name.... Spinoza's French school and the supporters of deism were but two sects disputing over the true meaning of his system...." (The Holy Family, 1844).

Of all the generally acknowledged great philosophers in history, Spinoza is among the least accessible authors and among the most puzzling to read, understand and interpret. There have been several historically remarkable movements/schools of Spinoza reception and interpretation in various countries, notably Germany, France, Italy,Duffy, Simon B. (2014), 'French and Italian Spinozism,'. In: Rosi Braidotti (ed.), After Poststructuralism: Transitions and Transformations. (London: Routledge, 2014), p. 148–168 and Latin America (in particular Argentina, Brazil, and Mexico). In the history of Western thought, two well-known and highly significant Spinoza revivals include German-inspired Neo-Spinozism (of approximately the late 18th and early 19th centuries)Forster, Michael N.: After Herder: Philosophy of Language in the German Tradition. (Oxford: Oxford University Press, 2010). Michael N. Forster (2010): "During the last quarter or so of the eighteenth century and then well into the nineteenth century a wave of neo-Spinozism swept through German philosophy and literature: in addition to Lessing and Herder, further neo-Spinozists included Goethe, Schelling, Hegel, Schleiermacher, Hölderlin, Novalis, and Friedrich Schlegel. This wave was largely a result of Herder's embrace of neo-Spinozism in God: Some Conversations (and in Goethe's case, Herder's sympathy with Spinozism even before that work)." and French-inspired Neo-Spinozism (of approximately the late 20th and early 21st centuries). Alberto Toscano: "Though Spinozists have existed ever since the radical circles that rippled through Europe in the wake of Spinoza's death, I think it is fair to say that only in the past 50 years or so has there been a Spinozism to match in hermeneutic rigour and creative interventions the history of Kantianism or Hegelianism, that only now has the hereticism that Althusser referred to been complemented by the labour of the concept. Arguably, it is only now then that the scope of his thought and its relevance to our social and political existence can be truly appreciated, at a historical juncture when the communicative power of the multitude and of what Marx called the general intellect is so intensified that the physics, ethics, ontology and politics of Spinoza (what are ultimately indissociable facets of his philosophizing) can be thought simultaneously. Today more than ever, one might argue, is Spinoza, as Pierre Macherey puts it, ‘an irreplaceable reactor and developer’." ('The Politics of Spinozism: Composition and Communication', Paper presented at the Cultural Research Bureau of Iran, Tehran, 4 January 2005)
 Alberto Toscano: "That a Spinozist social science should be of French concoction is no coincidence: from the historical scholarship of Martial Guéroult to Alexandre Matheron's pioneering study of the individual and community in Spinoza; from the centrality of Spinoza's materialism to the Althusserian project to Gilles Deleuze's radical re-working of his philosophy of immanence and the advances of contemporary scholarship, France has an altogether impressive tradition of Spinoza interpretation. At the heart of this retooling of a seventeenth-century metaphysics is the liquidation of the ‘Cartesian’ bourgeois-individual subject which supposedly animated the humanist visions of French phenomenology and existentialism. Althusser, of course, approached Spinoza's work philosophically—as a detour, seeking grounds for a critique of idealism, en route to a properly materialist Marxist philosophy—but also critically, noting for example its lack of a theory of contradiction. Lordon, by contrast, was looking for a conceptual framework through which to rethink social, economic and political life; Spinoza's work is only glancingly contrasted to that of his peers—there is no ‘outside’ to his thinking here. Yet, as with Althusser or Deleuze, Lordon's perspective would remain anchored in the affirmation of Spinoza as the thinker who can emancipate us from the delusions of free will or untrammelled individual choice, allowing us to grasp human struggles for existence in a disabused materialist fashion." ('A Structuralism of Feeling? Alberto Toscano on Frédéric Lordon', Verso Books, 12 April 2016)
 Katja Diefenbach: "Reading Capital [by Louis Althusser] forms the prelude to a wave of Spinoza receptions, in which seventeenth-century metaphysics is shifted far beyond Marxism into the radiant presence of structuralist philosophy. While after Husserl's Paris lectures on the Meditations and Sartre's publication of The Transcendence of the Ego, France experienced a phenomenological Descartes revival, Spinoza research [especially in France] remained, until the mid-1960s, a largely underdeveloped field. In the course of a fulminant boost in reception in 1968 and 1969, in almost a single year, the studies of Martial Gueroult, Alexandre Matheron, Gilles Deleuze and Bernard Rousset were published. Under the influence of Gueroult's structural-genetic reading, they displayed an unprecedented systematic precision to position Spinoza's thought against Descartes – particularly, against the doctrine of two substances, the depotentialization of nature, the use of the medieval concept of contingency and the idea of the incomprehensibility of a God of arbitrary decree implicated in the doctrine of the creation of the eternal truths. In comparison Althusser's reading of Spinoza is characterized by an inverse proportion of philosophical precision and the strategic positioning of Spinoza in Marxism." ('Is it simple to be a Spinozist in philosophy? Althusser and Deleuze', Radical Philosophy, Sept/Oct 2016)

For many, Spinoza is not only a pure philosophical author but also a unique source of literary inspiration, who—despite his notoriously difficult thought, highly abstract concepts, highly complex doctrines, highly rigid writing style, dry personality and intensely private life—has greatly influenced so many prominent literary writers, particularly poets and fiction authors.

The following is a list of works about Spinoza.

Nonfiction works
Books, dissertations and theses
Biography
 Alexander, Bernhard: Spinoza. (München: Ernst Reinhardt, 1923) [in German]
 Alexander, Samuel: Spinoza and Time: Fourth Arthur Davis Memorial Lecture. With an Afterword by Viscount Haldane. (London: G. Allen & Unwin, 1921)
 Alexander, Samuel: Spinoza: An Address in Commemoration of the Tercentenary of Spinoza's Birth [Manchester University Lectures, No. 29]. (Manchester: Manchester University Press, 1933)
 Arnau, Juan: El cristal Spinoza. (Valencia: Pre-Textos, 2012)  [in Spanish]
 Altkirch, Ernst: Spinoza im Porträt. (Jena: Verlegt bei Eugen Diederichs, 1913) [in German]
 Askanasy, Helene: Spinoza und De Witt. Neun Bilder vom Kampfder "Freiheit" um die Republik und ein Epilog. (Wien: Amalthea, 1931) [in German]
 Bartuschat, Wolfgang: Baruch de Spinoza. (München: C.H.Beck, 2006) [in German]
 Bayle, Pierre: Dizionario storico e critico: Spinoza. Traduzione di Piero Bertolucci. (Torino: Bollati Boringhieri, 1968) [in Italian]
 Bayle, Pierre: Écrits sur Spinoza [Dictionnaire Historique et Critique]. Textes choisis et présentés par Françoise Charles-Daubert et Pierre-François Moreau. (Paris: Berg International Editeurs, 1983) [in French]
 Bayle, Pierre: Over Spinoza. Bezorgd onder redactie van Henri Krop en Jacob van Sluis, vertaald in samenwerking met Louis Hoffman, Gerrit van der Meer en Albert Willemsen. (Budel: Damon, 2006) [in Dutch]
 Bayle, Pierre: Dizionario storico e critico: Spinoza. (Milano: Pgreco, 2015) [in Italian]
 Bolin, Wilhelm: Spinoza: Ein Kultur- und Lebensbild. (Berlin: Ernst Hofmann & Co., 1894) [in German]
 Bolin, Wilhelm: Spinoza: Zeit, Leben, Werk [2. Aufl., neu bearb. von Carl Gebhardt]. (Darmstadt: Ernst Hofmann & Co., 1927) [in German]
 Browne, Lewis: Blessed Spinoza: A Biography of the Philosopher. (New York: The Macmillan Company, 1932)
 Colerus, Johannes (a.k.a. Köhler, Johannes): Korte, dog waaragtige levens-beschrijving, van Benedictus de Spinoza. (Amsterdam: Lindenberg, 1705) [in Dutch]
 Colerus, Johannes (a.k.a. Köhler, Johannes): The Life of Benedict de Spinosa. Originally written in Dutch, it was translated and published in English and French in 1706. (London: Benjamin Bragg, 1706)
 Colerus, Johannes (a.k.a. Köhler, Johannes); Lucas, Jean-Maximilien: Le vite di Spinoza. A cura di Roberto Bordoli. (Marcerata: Quodlibet, 2015) [in Italian]
 Cresson, André: Spinoza: sa vie, son oeuvre, avec un exposé de sa philosophie. (Paris: F. Alcan, 1940; Paris: PUF, 1943) [in French]
 D'Uggento, Maria Rosaria: Baruch degli angeli. (Trento: Edizioni del Faro, 2012) [in Italian]
 D'Uggento, Maria Rosaria: Spinoza, il filosofo «edificante». (Castiglione di Sicilia: Il Convivio Editore, 2019) [in Italian]
 De Casseres, Benjamin: Spinoza: Liberator of God and Man, 1632–1932. (New York: E. Wickham Sweetland, 1932)
 De Vries, Theun: Spinoza: Beeldenstormer en wereldbouwer. (Amsterdam: H.J.W. Becht, 1972) [in Dutch]
 De Vries, Theun: Spinoza, biografie. (Amsterdam: De Prom, 1991) [in Dutch]
 Domínguez, Atilano: Biografías de Spinoza. (Madrid: Alianza, 1995) [in Spanish]
 Domínguez, Atilano (ed.): Spinoza: Obras completas y biografías. (Madrid: ViveLibro, 2015)  [in Spanish]
 Fischer, Kuno: Vida de Spinoza. Traducción de Luis Felipe Segura Martínez. (México, D.F.: Universidad Autónoma Metropolitana, 1990) [in Spanish]
 Freudenthal, Jacob: Spinoza, sein Leben und seine Lehre. (Stuttgart: F. Frommann, 1904) [in German]
 Gangale, Lucia: Il giovane Spinoza. (Tricase: Libellula Edizioni, 2019) [in Italian]
 Goldstein, Rebecca: Betraying Spinoza: The Renegade Jew Who Gave Us Modernity. (New York: Schocken, 2006)
 Goldstein, Rebecca: De onbekende Spinoza. Vertaald door Henk Schreuder. (Amsterdam/Antwerpen: Uitgeverij Atlas, 2007) [in Dutch]
 Gullan-Whur, Margaret: Within Reason: A Life of Spinoza. (London: Pimlico, 2000) 
 Jaspers, Karl: Spinoza. Traduzione dal tedesco di Gianpaolo Bartoli. (Roma: Castelvecchi, 2015) [in Italian]
 Jellesz, Jarig; Meyer, Lodewijk: Spinoza par ses amis. Traduit du Latin, préfacé et annoté par Maxime Rovère. (Paris: Éditions Payot & Rivages, 2017) [in French]
 Kayser, Rudolph: Spinoza: Portrait of a Spiritual Hero. Translated by A. Allen and M. Newmark, with preface by Albert Einstein. (New York: Philosophical Library, 1946)
 Lehmann, Devra: Spinoza: Outcast Thinker. (South Hampton, NH: Namelos, 2014)
 Levin, Dan: Spinoza, the Young Thinker Who Destroyed the Past. (New York: Weybright & Talley, 1970)
 Lucas, Jean-Maximilien; Saint-Glain, Dominique de: La vie de Spinosa. (Hambourg: Kunrath, 1735) [in French]
 Lucas, Jean-Maximilien: The Oldest Biography of Spinoza. Translated and edited by Abraham Wolf. (London: George Allen & Unwin, 1927) 
 Millner, Simon L.: The Face of Benedictus Spinoza. (New York: Machmadim Art Editions, 1946)
 Minc, Alain: Spinoza, un roman juif. (Paris: Gallimard, 1999) [in French]
 Nadler, Steven: Spinoza: A Life. (Cambridge: Cambridge University Press, 1999)
 Nadler, Steven: Spinoza [Przeł. Władysław Jeżewski]. (Warszawa: Państwowy Instytut Wydawniczy, 2002) [in Polish]
 Nadler, Steven: Baruch Spinoza e l'Olanda del Seicento. (Torino: Einaudi, 2002) [in Italian]
 Nadler, Steven: Spinoza, une vie. Traduit de l'anglais par Jean-François Sené. (Paris: Bayard, 2003) [in French]
 Nadler, Steven: Spinoza: Bir Yaşam, çev. Anıl Duman ve Murat Başekim. (İstanbul: İletişim Yayınları, 2008) [in Turkish]
 Schwartz, Daniel B.: The First Modern Jew: Spinoza and the History of an Image. (Princeton, NJ: Princeton University Press, 2012)
 Serpentini, Elso Simone: Ritorno a Spinoza. (Mosciano Sant'Angelo: Artemia Nova Editrice, 2017) [in Italian]
 Sérouya, Henri: Spinoza, sa vie et sa philosophie. (Paris: Éditions Excelsior, 1933) [in French]
 Stewart, Matthew: The Courtier and the Heretic: Leibniz, Spinoza, and the Fate of God in the Modern World. (New York: W.W. Norton & Company, 2006)
 Stewart, Matthew: Il cortigiano e l'eretico. Leibniz, Spinoza e il destino di Dio nel mondo moderno. Traduzione di Francesco Sircana e Marta C. Sircana. (Milano: Feltrinelli, 2007) [in Italian]
 Stewart, Matthew: El hereje y el cortesano. Spinoza y Leibniz, y el destino de Dios en el mundo moderno. Traducción de Josep Sarret Grau. (Barcelona: Biblioteca Buridán, 2007) [in Spanish]
 Van Vloten, Johannes: Baruch d'Espinoza, zijn leven en schriften in verband met zijnen en onzen tijd. (Amsterdam: K.H. Schadd, 1865) [in Dutch]
 Van Vloten, Johannes: Benedictus de Spinoza, naar leven en werken, in verband met zijnen en onzen tijd geschetst. Tweede herziene en vermeerderde druk. (Schiedam: H.A.M. Roelants, 1871) [in Dutch]
 Wolfson, Abraham: Spinoza: A Life of Reason. (New York: Modern Classics, 1932)

General studies
 Adler, Adam: Emerson's Hidden Influence: What Can Spinoza Tell the Boy?. (BA thesis, Georgia State University, 2007)
 Allison, Henry: Benedict de Spinoza: An Introduction. (New Haven, CT: Yale University Press, 1987)
 Altini, Carlo: La fábrica de la soberanía: Maquiavelo, Hobbes, Spinoza y otros modernos. (Buenos Aires: El Cuenco de Plata, 2005) [in Spanish]
 Altini, Carlo (ed.): La fortuna di Spinoza in età moderna e contemporanea [2 vols.]. (Pisa: Edizioni della Scuole Normale Superiore di Pisa, 2019) [in Italian]
 Amoroso, Leonardo: Scintille ebraiche. Spinoza, Vico e Benamozegh. (Pisa: Edizioni ETS, 2004) [in Italian]
 Andrés, Ramón: El luthier de Delft. Música, pintura y ciencia en tiempos de Vermeer y Spinoza. (Barcelona: Acantilado, 2013) [in Spanish]
 Angel, Marc D.: Maimonides, Spinoza and Us: Toward an Intellectually Vibrant Judaism. (Woodstock, VT: Jewish Lights Publishing, 2009)
 Ansaldi, Saverio: Nature et puissance. Giordano Bruno et Spinoza. (Paris: Editions Kimé, 2006) [in French]
 Ansay, Pierre: Gaston Lagaffe philosophe: Franquin, Deleuze et Spinoza. (Brussels: Éditions Couleur livres, 2012) [in French]
 Ansay, Pierre: Nos devenirs spinoziens, fraternels et anarchistes. (Brussels: Éditions Couleur livres, 2013) [in French]
 Ansay, Pierre: Petite plomberie spirituelle et philosophique: De Spinoza à Maître Eckhart. (Mons: Éditions Couleur livres, 2014) [in French]
 Ansay, Pierre: Restons stoïques face à ce monde inquiétant. Épictète et Spinoza peuvent nous y aider. (Brussels: Éditions Couleur livres, 2017) [in French]
 Armour, Leslie: Being and Idea: Development of Some Themes in Spinoza and Hegel [Philosophische Texte und Studien, Band 26]. (Hildesheim: Georg Olms, 1992)
 Arnett, James J.: Eliot's Spinoza: Realism, Affect, and Ethics. (PhD diss., City University of New York, 2013)
 Astesiano, Lionel: Joie et liberté chez Bergson et Spinoza. (Paris: CNRS Éditions, 2016) [in French]
 Astrada, Carlos: Goethe y el panteísmo spinoziano. (Santa Fe, Argentina: Instituto Social de la Universidad del Litoral, 1933) [in Spanish]
 Atkins, Dorothy: George Eliot and Spinoza. (Salzburg: University of Salzburg, 1978)
 Attal, José: La non-excommunication de Jacques Lacan. Quand la psychanalyse a perdu Spinoza. (Paris: L'Unebévue Éditeur, 2010) [in French]
 Auteri, Giuseppe; Raciti, Giuseppe (eds.): Saggi su Colli, Spinoza, Derrida. (Catania: Edizioni CUECM, 1999) [in Italian]
 Avenarius, Richard: Über die beiden ersten Phasen des Spinozischen Pantheismus und das Verhältnis der zweiten zur dritten Phase. Nebst einem Anhang: Über Reihenfolge und Abfassungszeit der älteren Schriften Spinoza's. (Leipzig: Avenarius, 1868) [in German]
 Baader, Franz von: Über die Nothwendigkeit einer Revision der Wissenschaft natürlicher, menschlicher und Göttlicher Dinge, in Bezug auf die in ihr sich noch mehr oder minder geltend machenden Cartesischen und Spinozistischen Philosopheme. (Erlangen: J. J. Palm & Ernst Enke, 1841) [in German]
 Badiou, Alain: Le Séminaire. L'infini. Aristote, Spinoza, Hegel, 1984–1985. (Paris: Fayard, 2016) [in French]
 Badiou, Alain: Il seminario. L'infinito. Aristotele, Spinoza, Hegel. A cura di A. Destasio. (Napoli-Salerno: Orthotes Editrice, 2018) [in Italian]
 Bagley, P.J. (ed.): Piety, Peace, and the Freedom to Philosophize. (Dordrecht: Springer, 1999)
 Bailone, Giuseppe: Viaggio nella filosofia. Spinoza, Locke, Leibniz e Vico. (Torino: Università Popolare di Torino Editore, 2013) [in Italian]
 Bamberger, Fritz: Spinoza and Anti-Spinoza Literature: The Printed Literature of Spinozism, 1665–1832. (Cincinnati: Hebrew Union College Press, 2003)
 Barata Ribeiro, Bernardo Bianchi: O fio vermelho da transformação: Marx e Spinoza. (Ph.D. diss., Universidade do Estado do Rio de Janeiro, 2015) [in Portuguese]
 Barata Ribeiro, Bernardo Bianchi: Le fil rouge de la transformation: Marx et Spinoza. (Ph.D. diss., Université Paris 1 Panthéon-Sorbonne, 2015) [in French]
 Barmore, Jerry W.: Theology and Politics in Maimonides, Spinoza, Hegel, and Nietzsche. (PhD diss., University of Illinois at Urbana–Champaign, 2004)
 Bartels, Jeroen: De geschiedenis van het subject, deel I: Descartes, Spinoza, Kant. (Kampen: Kok Agora, 1993) [in Dutch]
 Basso, Paola: Il secolo geometrico. La questione del metodo matematico in filosofia da Spinoza a Kant. (Firenze: Le Lettere, 2004) [in Italian]
 Bauer, Emmanuel J.: Das Denken Spinozas und seine Interpretation durch Jacobi. (Frankfurt am Main: Peter Lang, 1989) [in German]
 Bayle, Pierre: Dictionnaire Historique et Critique [3rd ed.; 4 vols.]. (Rotterdam: Michel Bohm, 1720) [in French]
 Beiser, Frederick C.: The Fate of Reason: German Philosophy from Kant to Fichte. (Cambridge, MA: Harvard University Press, 1987)
 Bell, David: Spinoza in Germany from 1670 to the Age of Goethe. (London: University of London, Institute of Germanic Studies, 1984)
 Benigni, Fiormichele: Itinerari dell'antispinozismo. Spinoza e le metafisiche cartesiane in Francia (1684–1718). (Firenze: Le Lettere, 2018) [in Italian]
 Bennett, Jonathan: Learning from Six Philosophers: Descartes, Spinoza, Leibniz, Locke, Berkeley, Hume [2 vols.]. (Oxford: Oxford University Press, 2001)
 Bernard, Walter: De filosofie van Spinoza en Constantin Brunner. (Assen: Van Gorcum, 1977) [in Dutch]
 Bernard, Walter: Spinozas Bedeutung für die moderne Psychologie, aus dem Englischen von G. Schmidt, hrsg. von J. Stenzel und G. Schmid. (Essen: Verlag Die Blaue Eule, 1995) [in German]
 Berti, Silvia; Charles-Daubert, Françoise; Popkin, Richard H. (eds.): Heterodoxy, Spinozism, and Free Thought in Early-Eighteenth-Century Europe: Studies on the "Traité des trois imposteurs". (Dordrecht: Springer, 1996)
 Betz, H. J.: Spinoza en Kant. ('s Gravenhage: M. Nijhoff, 1883) [in Dutch]
 Biale, David: Not in the Heavens: The Tradition of Jewish Secular Thought. (Princeton, NJ: Princeton University Press, 2011)
 Billeter, Jean François: Chine trois fois muette. Essai sur l'histoire contemporaine et la Chine, suivi de: Bref essai sur l'histoire de Chine, d'après Spinoza. (Paris: Éditions Allia, 2000) [in French]
 Bir, Çağan: Spinoza ve Nietzsche'de yaşamın olumlanması sorunu. (MA thesis, Ankara University, 2016) [in Turkish]
 Biscuso, Massimiliano: Leopardi tra i filosofi: Spinoza, Vico, Kant, Nietzsche. (Napoli: La Scuola di Pitagora, 2019) [in Italian]
 Bloch, Olivier (ed.): Spinoza au XVIIIe siècle. Actes des Journées d'études organisées les 6 et 13 décembre 1987 à la Sorbonne. (Paris: Méridiens Klincksieck, 1990) [in French]
 Blondel, Maurice: Dialogues avec les philosophes: Descartes, Spinoza, Malebranche, Pascal, Saint Augustin. Préface par Henri Gouhier. (Paris: Aubier-Montaigne, 1966) [in French]
 Blondel, Maurice: Cartesio, Malebranche, Spinoza, Pascal: Saggi di storia della filosofia. A cura di Olga Arcuno. (Firenze: La Nuova Italia, 1974) [in Italian]
 Bolduc, Carl R.: Kant et Spinoza. Rencontre paradoxale. (Paris: Éditions du Félin, 2015) [in French]
 Bollacher, Martin: Der junge Goethe und Spinoza. Studien zur Geschichte des Spinozismus in der Epoche des Sturm und Drang. (Tübingen: Niemeyer, 1968) [in German]
 Bordoli, Roberto: Ragione e scrittura tra Descartes e Spinoza. Saggio sulla "Philosophia S. Scripturae Interpres" di Lodewijk Meyer e sulla sua recezione. (Milano: Franco Angeli, 1997) [in Italian]
 Bordoli, Roberto: L'Illuminismo di Dio: alle origini della mentalità liberale. Religione, teologia, filosofia e storia in Johann Salomo Semler (1725–1791). Contributo per lo studio delle fonti teologiche, cartesiane e spinoziane dell'Aufklärung. (Firenze: Leo S. Olschki, 2004) [in Italian]
 Bordoli, Roberto: Dio ragione verità. Le polemiche su Descartes e su Spinoza presso l'Università di Franeker (1686–1719). (Macerata: Quodlibet, 2009) [in Italian]
 Boss, Gilbert: La différence des philosophies, Hume et Spinoza [2 vols.]. (Zurich: Éditions du Grand Midi, 1982) [in French]
 Boss, Gilbert: Lectures philosophiques: Abélard, Descartes, Hobbes, Spinoza. (Zurich: Éditions du Grand Midi, 2004) [in French]
 Boucher, Wayne I. (ed.): Spinoza: Eighteenth and Nineteenth-Century Discussions [6 vols.]. (Bristol: Thoemmes Press, 1999)
 Boucher, Wayne I. (ed.): Spinoza in English: A Bibliography from the Seventeenth Century to the Present [2nd ed.]. (Bristol: Thoemmes Press, 1999)
 Bouton, Christophe (ed.): Dieu et la nature: la question du panthéisme dans l'idéalisme allemand. (Hildesheim: Georg Olms, 2005) [in French]
 Bouveresse, Renée: Spinoza et Leibniz: L'idée d'animisme universel. (Paris: Vrin, 1992) [in French]
 Brennan, Andrew; Witoszek, Nina (eds.): Philosophical Dialogues: Arne Næss and the Progress of Ecophilosophy. (Lanham, MD.: Rowman & Littlefield, 1999)
 Brockdorff, Cay von: Beiträge über das Verhältnis Schopenhauers zu Spinoza. (Hildesheim: Gerstenberg, 1900) [in German]
 Brunner, Peter: Probleme der Teleologie bei Maimonides, Thomas von Aquin und Spinoza. (Heidelberg: Carl Winters Universitätsbuchhandlung, 1928) [in German]
 Brunschvicg, Léon: Écrits philosophiques. Tome I. L'humanisme de l'Occident: Descartes, Spinoza, Kant. (Paris: PUF, 1951) [in French]
 Bugallo, Alicia Irene: La filosofía ambiental de Arne Naess. Influencias de Spinoza y James. (Río Cuarto, Argentina: Ediciones del Icala, 2011)  [in Spanish]
 Busellato, Stefano: Schopenhauer lettore di Spinoza. Le choise all'Etica. (Macerata: EUM, 2015) [in Italian]
 Buyse, Filip: La conception des corps chez Spinoza et Galilée. (PhD diss., Université Paris 1 Panthéon-Sorbonne, 2014) [in French]
 Caird, John: Spinoza. (Edinburgh: Blackwood, 1888)
 Callot, Émile: Problèmes du cartésianisme: Descartes, Malebranche, Spinoza. (Annecy: Gardet, 1956) [in French]
 Calvetti, Carla Gallicet: Spinoza lettore del Machiavelli. (Milano: Vita e Pensiero, 1972) [in Italian]
 Calvetti, Carla Gallicet: Benedetto Spinoza di fronte a Leone Ebreo (Jehudah Abarbanel). Problemi etico-religiosi e "amor Dei intellectualis". (Milano: CUSL, 1982) [in Italian]
 Campos, André Santos: Spinoza: Basic Concepts. (Exeter, UK: Imprint Academic Press, 2015)
 Canaslan, Eylem; Akal, Cemal Bâli (eds.): Marx'tan Spinoza'ya, Spinoza'dan Marx'a: Güncel Müdahaleler. (Ankara: Dost Kitabevi, 2013) [in Turkish]
 Canaslan, Eylem; Ateşoğlu, Güçlü (eds.): Spinoza ile Karşılaşmalar. (İstanbul: Ayrıntı Yayınları, 2015) [in Turkish]
 Carp, J.H.: Spinoza en Goethe. ('s-Gravenhage: Boekh. en Uitgevers Mij. v/h W.P. van Stockum & Zn., 1932) [in Dutch]
 Carpintero, Enrique: La alegría de lo necesario: Las pasiones y el poder en Spinoza y Freud. (Ciudad Autónoma de Buenos Aires: Topía Editorial, 2015) [in Spanish]
 Carritt, Edgar Frederick: Morals and Politics: Theories of their Relation from Hobbes and Spinoza to Marx and Bosanquet. (Oxford: Clarendon Press, 1935)
 Chalier, Catherine: Spinoza, lecteur de Maïmonide. La question théologico-politique. (Paris: Cerf, 2006) [in French]
 Chen, Xiaosheng: A Neo-Confucian Approach to a Puzzle Concerning Spinoza's Doctrine of the Intellectual Love of God. (PhD thesis, University of Birmingham, 2018)
 Chiereghin, Franco: L'influenza dello spinozismo nella formazione della filosofia hegeliana. (Padova: CEDAM, 1961) [in Italian]
 Christ, Kurt: Jacobi und Mendelssohn: Eine Analyse des Spinozastreits. (Würzburg: Königshausen & Neumann, 1988)
 Citton, Yves: L'envers de la liberté. L'invention d'un imaginaire spinoziste dans la France des Lumières. (Paris: Éditions Amsterdam, 2006) [in French]
 Clemens, Ernst: Schopenhauer und Spinoza. (Ph.D diss., Leipzig, 1899) [in German]
 Collette, Daniel: Stoicism in Descartes, Pascal, and Spinoza: Examining Neostoicism's Influence in the Seventeenth Century. (PhD diss., University of South Florida, 2016)
 Crapulli, Giovanni; Boscherini, Emilia Giancotti (eds.): Ricerche lessicali su opere di Descartes e Spinoza. (Roma: Edizioni dell'Ateneo, 1968) [in Italian]
 Cristofolini, Paolo; et al.: Teoria. Rivista di filosofia fondata da Vittorio Sainati: Spinoza nel XXI secolo. (Pisa: Edizioni ETS, 2012) [in Italian]
 Coert, Jan: Spinoza en Grotius: Met betrekking tot het volkenrecht. (Leiden: E.J. Brill, 1936) [in Dutch]
 Cohen, Hermann: Spinoza on State and Religion, Judaism and Christianity. Translated from the German by Robert S. Schine. (Jerusalem: Shalem Press, 2014)
 Cohen, Hermann: Spinoza: Stato e religione, ebraismo e cristianesimo. A cura di Roberto Bertoldi. (Brescia: Morcelliana, 2010) [in Italian]
 Collins, Arthur W.: Thought and Nature: Studies in Rationalist Philosophy. (Notre Dame, IN: Notre Dame University Press, 1985)
 Comte-Sponville, André: Du tragique au matérialisme (et retour): Vingt-six études sur Montaigne, Pascal, Spinoza, Nietzsche et quelques autres. (Paris: PUF, 2015) [in French]
 Congleton, Ann: Spinoza, Kierkegaard and the Eternal Particular. (PhD diss., Yale University, 1962)
 Cook, J. Thomas: Spinoza's 'Ethics': A Reader's Guide. (London: Continuum, 2007)
 Coppens, Gunther (ed.): Spinoza en de scholastiek. (Leuven: Acco, 2003) [in Dutch]
 Coppens, Gunther (ed.): Spinoza en het Nederlands cartesianisme. (Leuven: Acco, 2004) [in Dutch]
 Czelinski-Uesbeck, Michael: Der tugendhafte Atheist. Studien zur Vorgeschichteder Spinoza-Renaissance in Deutschland [Schriftenreihe der Spinoza-Gesellschaft; Band 13]. (Würzburg: Königshausen & Neumann, 2007) [in German]
 Curley, Edwin: Spinoza's Metaphysics: An Essay in Interpretation. (Cambridge, MA: Harvard University Press, 1968)
 Curley, Edwin (trans., ed.): The Collected Works of Spinoza, Vol. I. (Princeton, NJ: Princeton University Press, 1985)
 Curley, Edwin: Behind the Geometrical Method: A Reading of Spinoza's 'Ethics'''. (Princeton, NJ: Princeton University Press, 1988)
 Curley, Edwin (trans., ed.): A Spinoza Reader: The 'Ethics' and Other Works. (Princeton, NJ: Princeton University Press, 1994)
 Curley, Edwin (trans., ed.): The Collected Works of Spinoza, Vol. II. (Princeton, NJ: Princeton University Press, 2016)
 Dagron, Tristan: Toland et Leibniz: L'Invention du Néo-Spinozisme. (Paris: Vrin, 2009) [in French]
 Dalledonne, Andrea: Il rischio della libertà: S. Tommaso – Spinoza. (Milano: Marzorati Editore, 1990) [in Italian]
 De Carolis, Francesco: Verso un'ontologia della vita: Ricoeur lettore di Spinoza. (PhD diss., Università degli Studi di Napoli Federico II, 2010) [in Italian]
 Dea, Shannon: Peirce and Spinoza's Surprising Pragmatism. (PhD diss., University of Western Ontario, 2007)
 Deborin, Abram M.; Thalheimer, August: Spinozas Stellung in der Vorgeschichte des dialektischen Materialismus: Reden und Aufsätze zur Wiederkehr seines 250. Todestages. (Wien: Verlag für Literatur und Politik, 1928) [in German]
 DeBrabander, Firmin: Spinoza and the Stoics: Power, Politics and the Passions. (London: Continuum, 2007)
 Dejardin, Bertrand: L'immanence ou le sublime. Observations sur les réactions de Kant face à Spinoza dans la Critique de la faculté de juger. (Paris: L'Harmattan, 2001) [in French]
 Dejardin, Bertrand: La liberté, l'existence et la mort chez Spinoza et Freud. (Paris: L'Harmattan, 2018) [in French]
 Del Lucchese, Filippo: Tumulti e indignatio. Conflitto, diritto e moltitudine in Machiavelli e Spinoza. (Milano: Edizioni Ghibli, 2004) [in Italian]
 Del Lucchese, Filippo (ed.): Storia politica della moltitudine. Spinoza e la modernità. (Roma: DeriveApprodi, 2009) [in Italian]
 Del Lucchese, Filippo: Conflict, Power, and Multitude in Machiavelli and Spinoza: Tumult and Indignation. (New York: Continuum, 2009)
 Del Lucchese, Filippo: Machiavelli ve Spinoza'da Çatışma, Güç ve Çokluk, çev. Orkun Güner. (İstanbul: Otonom Yayıncılık, 2016) [in Turkish]
 Deregibus, Arturo: Bruno e Spinoza: La realtà dell'infinito e il problema della sua unità. Vol I: Il concetto dell'infinito nel pensiero filosofico di Bruno. (Torino: Edizioni Giappichelli, 1981) [in Italian]
 Deregibus, Arturo: Bruno e Spinoza: La realtà dell'infinito e il problema della sua unità. Vol II: La Dottrina di Spinoza sull'Infinito. (Torino: Edizioni Giappichelli, 1981) [in Italian]
 Delahunty, R.J.: Spinoza: The Arguments of the Philosophers. (London: Routledge & Kegan Paul, 1985)
 Della Rocca, Michael: Spinoza [Routledge Philosophers]. (London/New York: Routledge, 2008)
 Den Tex, Jan: Locke en Spinoza over de tolerantie. (Amsterdam: Scheltema & Holkema, 1926) [in Dutch]
 Dernoscheck, Georg Alex: Das Problem des egoistischen Perfektionismus in der Ethik Spinozas und Nietzsches. (Annaberg: Schreiber, 1905) [in German]
 Desantis, Anthony John: Philosophical Precursors to the Radical Enlightenment: Vignettes on the Struggle between Philosophy and Theology from the Greeks to Leibniz with Special Emphasis on Spinoza. (Ph.D. diss., University of South Florida, 2011)
 Diderot, Denis; d'Alembert, Jean le Rond: Encyclopédie, ou Dictionnaire raisonné des sciences, des arts et des métiers [17 vols.]. (Paris: Briasson, David, Le Breton, Durand; Neuchâtel: S. Faulche, 1751–66) [in French]
 Diodato, Roberto: Vermeer, Góngora, Spinoza. L'estetica come scienza intuitiva. (Milano: Mondadori Bruno 1998) [in Italian]
 Dittes, Friedrich: Über die sittliche Freiheit, mit besonderer Berücksichtigung der Systeme von Spinoza, Leibnitz, Kant. Nebst einer Abhandlung über den Eudämonismus. (Leipzig: Julius Klinkhardt, 1860) [in German]
 Domínguez, Atilano (ed.): La Ética de Spinoza. Fundamentos y Significado. Actas del congreso internacional: Almagro, 24–26 de Octubre, 1990. (Ciudad Real: Ediciones de la Universidad de Castilla-La Mancha, 1992) [in Spanish]
 Donna, Diego: Le catene di ragioni e l'ordine della natura. Teorie della conoscenza in Descartes e Spinoza. (Milano: Mimesis, 2016) [in Italian]
 Doueihi, Milad: Solitude de l'Incomparable: Augustin et Spinoza. (Paris: Éditions du Seuil, 2009) [in French]
 Doueihi, Milad: Augustine and Spinoza. Translated from the French by Jane Marie Todd. (Cambridge, MA: Harvard University Press, 2010)
 Douglas, Alexander X.: Spinoza and Dutch Cartesianism: Philosophy and Theology. (Oxford: Oxford University Press, 2015)
 Drieux, Philippe: Perception et sociabilité. La communication des passions chez Descartes et Spinoza. (Paris: Classiques Garnier, 2014) [in French]
 Ducheyne, Steffen (ed.): Reassessing the Radical Enlightenment. (London: Routledge, 2017)
 DuFer, Rick: Spinoza e popcorn. Da Game of thrones a Stranger things, capire la filosofia sparandosi un film o una serie TV. (Milano: De Agostini Editore, 2019) [in Italian]
 Duffy, Simon B.: The Logic of Expression: Quality, Quantity and Intensity in Spinoza, Hegel and Deleuze. (Aldershot, UK: Ashgate Publishing, 2006)
 Dunner, Joseph: Baruch Spinoza and Western Democracy: An Intrerpretation of His Philosophical, Religious and Political Thought. (New York: Philosophical Library, 1955)
 Durant, Will: Philosophy and the Social Problem. (New York: The Macmillan Company, 1917)
 Durant, Will: The Story of Philosophy: The Lives and Opinions of the Great Philosophers of the Western World. (New York: Simon & Schuster, 1926)
 Eichberg, Karl Ludwig Waldemar: Untersuchungen über die Beziehungen der Erkenntnislehre Spinozas zur Scholastik mit besonderer Berücksichtigung der Schule Okkams. (Borna-Leipzig: Buchdruckerei Robert Noske, 1910) [in German]
 Eksen, Gaye Çankaya: L'articulation de l'éthique et de la politique chez Spinoza et Sartre. (PhD diss., Université Panthéon-Sorbonne/Université Paris 1, 2013) [in French]
 Eksen, Gaye Çankaya: Spinoza et Sartre. De la politique des singularités à l'éthique de générosité. (Paris: Classiques Garnier, 2017) [in French]
 Eliot, Albert: Towards a Schizogenealogy of Heretical Materialism: between Bruno and Spinoza, Nietzsche, Deleuze and Other Philosophical Recluses. (Ph.D. thesis, University of Warwick, 1999)
 Ezcurdia, José: Vitalismo filosófico: Un emplazamiento ético y formativo (Ensayos sobre Spinoza, Nietzsche, Bergson y Jung). (Guanajuato: Universidad de Guanajuato, 2010) [in Spanish]
 Ezcurdia, José: Cuerpo y amor frente a la modernidad capitalista. A propósito de Spinoza, Bergson, Deleuze y Negri. (Ciudad de México: UNAM / Editorial Itaca, 2018) [in Spanish]
 Ertz, Stefanie: Vertrag und Gesetz: Das Naturrecht und die Bibel bei Grotius, Hobbes, Spinoza. (Würzburg: Königshausen & Neumann, 2014) [in German]
 Esposito, Roberto; Giovanni, Biagio de; Zarone, Giuseppe: Divenire della ragione moderna. Cartesio, Spinoza, Vico. (Napoli: Liguori, 1981) [in Italian]
 Esquivel Marín, Sigifredo: Pensar desde el cuerpo. Tres filósofos artistas: Spinoza, Nietzsche y Pessoa. (Tijuana, México: Consejo Nacional para la Cultura y las Artes / Centro Cultural Tijuana, 2006) [in Spanish]
 Färber, Andreas: Die Begründung der Wissenschaft aus reiner Vernunft: Descartes, Spinoza und Kant. (Freiburg/München: Verlag Karl Alber, 1999) [in German]
 Feder, Randi: Maimonides and Spinoza: Biblical Interpretation. (MA thesis, Loyola University Chicago, 2016)
 Fedorko, Viktor: Spinoza's Nomolous Monism: A Comparison of Spinoza and Donald Davidson's Philosophy of Mind. (M.A. thesis, University of Saskatchewan, 2019)
 Feuerbach, Ludwig: Geschichte der neuern Philosophie von Bacon von Verulam bis Benedict Spinoza. (Ansbach: C. Brügel, 1833) [in German]
 Feyerabend, Wilhelm: Schopenhauers Verhältnis zu Spinoza. (Bonn: Rheinischen Friedrich-Wilhelms-Universität zu Bonn, 1910) [in German]
 Finozzi, Riccardo: The Ethics of Thinking in Heidegger, Bruno & Spinoza. (PhD thesis, University of Warwick, 2012)
 Fischbach, Franck: Les productions des hommes: Marx avec Spinoza. (Paris: Presses Universitaires de France, 2005) [in French]
 Fluss, Harrison: Marx Without the Beard: A Critical Essay on Spinoza's Role in the History of Marxism. (MA thesis, Stony Brook University, 2009)
 Fluss, Harrison: The Specter of Spinoza: The Legacy of the Pantheism Controversy in Hegel's Thought. (Ph.D. diss., Stony Brook University, 2016)
 Foucher de Careil, Louis Alexandre: Leibniz, Descartes et Spinoza. (Paris: Librairie Philosophique de Ladrange, 1862) [in French]
 Fraenkel, Carlos; Perinetti, Dario; Smith, Justin E. H. (eds.): The Rationalists: Between Tradition and Innovation. (Dordrecht: Springer, 2011)
 Fraenkel, Carlos: Philosophical Religions from Plato to Spinoza: Reason, Religion, and Autonomy. (Cambridge/New York: Cambridge University Press, 2012)
 Franchi, Ausonio (Bonavino, Cristoforo): Letture su la storia della filosofia moderna. Bacone, Descartes, Spinoza, Malebranche. (Milano: Fratelli Ferrario, 1863) [in Italian] 
 Freudenthal, Jakob: Die Lebensgeschichte Spinoza's in Quellenschriften: Urkunden Und Nichtamtlichen Nachrichten. (Leipzig: Verlag von Veit & Comp., 1898) [in German]
 Friedmann, Georges: Leibniz et Spinoza [3rd ed.]. (Paris: Gallimard, 1975) [in French]
 Frim, David Landon: Monism, Pluralism, and the Politics of Toleration: An Analysis of Spinoza's Rationalist Political Philosophy and its 20th Century Critics. (PhD diss., Stony Brook University, 2012) 
 Frohschammer, Jakob: Über die bedeutung der Einbildungskraft in der philosophie Kant's und Spinoza's. (München: Theodor Ackermann, 1879) [in German]
 Frondziak, Marie-Pierre: Croyance et soumission. De la critique de la religion à la critique sociale. Réflexions à partir de Spinoza et Freud. (Paris: L'Harmattan, 2019) [in French]
 Garber, Daniel; Ayers, Michael (eds.): The Cambridge History of Seventeenth-century philosophy [2 vols.]. (Cambridge: Cambridge University Press, 2003)
 Gaspari, Ilaria: Étude des passions et conscience de soi chez Spinoza et Pascal. (PhD diss., Université Paris 1 Panthéon-Sorbonne, 2015) [in French]
 Gebhardt, Carl; Walther, Manfred (eds.): Spinoza—Lebensbeschreibungen und Dokumente. (Hamburg: Felix Meiner Verlag, 1998) [in German]
 Giacon, Carlo: La causalità nel razionalismo moderno: Cartesio, Spinoza, Malebranche, Leibniz. (Milano/Roma: Bocca, 1954) [in Italian]
 Gignilliat, Mark S.: A Brief History of Old Testament Criticism: From Benedict Spinoza to Brevard Childs. (Grand Rapids, MI: Zondervan, 2012)
 Gilden, Hilail: The Problem of Political Liberty in Mill and Spinoza. (PhD diss., University of Chicago, 1963)
 Gilson, Etienne; Langan, Thomas: Modern Philosophy: From Descartes to Kant. (New York: Random House, 1963)
 Giovine, Vittorio: Dualism(s) Revisited: A Case Study of Daoist Internal Arts and Spinoza's Practical philosophy to Explore a Post-Cartesian Perspective of Embodiment. (PhD thesis, University of Kent, 2018)
 Girndt, Helmut (ed.): Selbstbehauptung und Anerkennung: Spinoza – Kant – Fichte – Hegel. (Sankt Augustin: Academia Verlag, 1990) [in German]
 Goldshur, David: Cognitive Domains in the Philosophies of Descartes and Spinoza. (Ph.D. diss., University of California, Los Angeles, 1941)
 Gordon, Abraham: Spinoza's Psychologie der Affekte mit Rucksicht auf Descartes. (Beslau: Druck von H. Sulzbach, 1874) [in German]
 Gore, Willard Clark: The Imagination in Spinoza and Hume: A Comparative Study in the Light of Some Recent Contributions to Psychology. (Chicago: The University of Chicago Press, 1902)
 Gottlieb, Anthony: The Dream of Enlightenment: The Rise of Modern Philosophy. (London: Liveright Publishing [W. W. Norton & Company], 2016)
 Graeser, Andreas (ed.): Studien zu Spinoza, Herder, Hölderlin und Hegel. (Sankt Augustin: Academia Verlag, 1999) [in German]
 Guidorizzi, Ernesto: L'orizzonte. Da Spinoza a Goethe. La poesia dell'infinito. (Napoli: Edizioni Scientifiche Italiane, 1991) [in Italian]
 Güner, Remzi Orkun: Liberalizm ve hak sorunu çerçevesinde Locke ve Spinoza'nın karşılaştırılması. (MA thesis, İstanbul Bilgi Üniversitesi, 2011) [in Turkish]
 Hampshire, Stuart: Spinoza: An Introduction to His Philosophical Thought. (London: Penguin Books, 1951)
 Hampshire, Stuart: The Age of Reason: The 17th Century Philosophers. Selected, with Introduction and Commentary. (New York: Mentor Books [New American Library], 1956)
 Hampshire, Stuart: Spinoza. (Baltimore, MD: Penguin Books, 1965)
 Hampshire, Stuart: Spinoza and Spinozism. (Oxford: Clarendon Press; New York: Oxford University Press, 2005)
 Hann, Franz Gustav: Die Ethik Spinozas und die Philosophie Descartes. (Innsbruck: Wagner, 1875) [in German]
 Hardy, Zachary J.: "A Constant Unfolding of Far-Resonate Action": George Eliot's 'Middlemarch', Spinoza, and the Ethics of Power. (BA thesis, College of William and Mary, 2015)
 Harrisville, Roy A.; Sundberg, Walter: The Bible in Modern Culture: Baruch Spinoza to Brevard Childs [2nd ed.]. (Grand Rapids: Wm. B. Eerdmans, 2002)
 Harte, Frederick Edward: The Philosophical Treatment of Divine Personality from Spinoza to Hermann Lotze. With a foreword by Herbert L. Stewart. (London: C. E. Kelly, 1913)
 Hayes, Frank A.: Platonic Elements in Spinoza's Theory of Method. (Ph.D. diss., Indiana University, 1957)
 Heamshaw, F. J. C. (ed.): The Social and Political Ideas of Some Great Thinkers of the Sixteenth and Seventeenth Centuries. (London: George G. Harrap & Co., 1926)
 Hebeisen, Alfred: Friedrich Heinrich Jacobi: Seine Auseinandersetzung mit Spinoza. (Bern: Paul Haupt, 1960) [in German]
 Hegel, Georg Friedrich: Lectures on the History of Philosophy [3 vols.; vol. 3]. Translated from the German by Elizabeth S. Haldane and Frances H. Simson. (London: K. Paul, Trench, Trübner & Co., 1896)
 Heine, Heinrich: Zur Geschichte der Religion und Philosophie in Deutschland. (Paris: Revue des deux Mondes, 1835; Altenmünster: Jazzybee Verlag Jürgen Beck, 2012) [in German]
 Helfferich, Adolf: Spinoza und Leibniz: oder, Das Wesen des Idealismus und des Realismus. (Hamburg und Gotha: Fr. & A. Perthes, 1846) [in German]
 Heller, Bernard: Is Spinozism Compatible with Judaism?. (New York: Bloch Publishing, 1927)
 Helmers, Helmer J.; Janssen, Geert H. (eds.): The Cambridge Companion to the Dutch Golden Age. (Cambridge: Cambridge University Press, 2018) 
 Herder, Johann Gottfried: Gott – einige Gespräche über Spinoza's System nebst Shaftesbury's Naturhymnus. (Gotha: Karl Wilhelm Ettinger, 1787; Gotha: Karl Wilhelm Ettinger, 1800) [in German]
 Herder, Johann Gottfried: Dio: Dialoghi sulla filosofia di Spinoza. A cura di Maria Cecilia Barbetta e Irene Perini Bianchi. (Milano: Franco Angeli, 1992) [in Italian]
 Hering, Robert E.: Spinoza im jungen Goethe [PhD diss.]. (Leipzig: Druck von Schmidt und Baumann, 1897) [in German]
 Hess, Moses: Die heilige Geschichte der Menschheit. Von einem Jünger Spinoza's. (Stuttgart: Hallberger'sche Verlagsbuchhandlung, 1837) [in German]
 Hess, Moses: The Holy History of Mankind and Other Writings. Edited and translated by Shlomo Avineri. (Cambridge: Cambridge University Press, 2004)
 Hölters, Hans: Der spinozistische Gottesbegriff bei M. Mendelssohn und F.H. Jacobi und der Gottesbegriff Spinozas. (Emsdetten: Lechte, 1938) [in German]
 Howie, Gillian: Deleuze and Spinoza: Aura of Expressionism. (New York: Palgrave Macmillan, 2002)
 Hubbard, Elbert: Little Journeys to the Homes of Great Philosophers [Little Journeys To the Homes of the Great; Vol. 8]. (New York: W.H. Wise & Co., 1916)
 Huenemann, Charles; Gennaro, Rocco J. (eds.): New Essays on the Rationalists. (New York: Oxford University Press, 1999)
 Iafelice, Henrique: Deleuze devorador de Spinoza. Teoria dos afetos e da educação. (São Paulo: EDUC, FAPESP, 2016) [in Portuguese]
 Ilyenkov, Evald Vasilyevich: Dialectical Logic: Essays on its History and Theory. Translated from the Russian by H. Campbell Creighton. (Moscow: Progress Publishers, 1977)
 Ioan, Razvan: "No one has yet determined what the body can do": the Turn to the Body in Spinoza and Nietzsche. (Ph.D. diss., Leiden University, 2017)
 Israel, Jonathan I.: Radical Enlightenment: Philosophy and the Making of Modernity, 1650–1750. (Oxford: Oxford University Press, 2001)
 Israel, Jonathan I.; Salverda, Reinier (eds.): Dutch Jewry: Its History and Secular Culture (1500–2000). (Leiden/Boston: Brill, 2002)
 Israel, Jonathan I.: Les Lumières radicales. La philosophie, Spinoza et la naissance de la modernité (1650–1750). Traduction de Pauline Hugues, Charlotte Nordmann et Jérôme Rosanvallon. (Paris: Éditions Amsterdam, 2005) [in French]
 Israel, Jonathan I.: Enlightenment Contested: Philosophy, Modernity, and the Emancipation of Man, 1670–1752. (Oxford: Oxford University Press, 2006)
 Israel, Jonathan I.: In strijd met Spinoza: Het failliet van de Nederlandse Verlichting (1670–1800). Vertaald door Hans van Cuijlenborg. (Amsterdam: Bert Bakker, 2007) [in Dutch]
 Israel, Jonathan I.: Democratic Enlightenment: Philosophy, Revolution, and Human Rights, 1750–1790. (Oxford: Oxford University Press, 2011)
 Israel, Jonathan I.: A Revolution of the Mind: Radical Enlightenment and the Intellectual Origins of Modern Democracy. (Princeton, NJ: Princeton University Press, 2011)
 Israel, Jonathan I.: Revolutionary Jews from Spinoza to Marx: The Fight for a Secular World of Universal and Equal Rights. (Seattle, WA: University of Washington Press, 2021)
 Iverach, James: Descartes, Spinoza and the New Philosophy. (New York: Charles Scribner's Sons, 1904)
 Jacobs, Justin B.: The Ancient Notion of Self-Preservation in the Theories of Hobbes and Spinoza. (Ph.D. diss., University of Cambridge, 2010)
 Jaireth, Subhash: Spinoza's Overcoat: Travels with Writers and Poets. (Melbourne: Transit Lounge Publishing, 2020)
 Jarrett, Charles E.: Spinoza: A Guide for the Perplexed. (London: Continuum, 2007)
 Jellinek, Georg: Die Beziehungen Goethes zu Spinoza. Vortrag gehalten im Vereine der Literaturfreunde zu Wien. (Wien: A. Hölder, 1878) [in German]
 Juffé, Michel: Sigmund Freud – Benedictus de Spinoza: Correspondance, 1676–1938. (Paris: Gallimard, 2016) [in French]
 Juffé, Michel: Freud – Spinoza Mektuplaşması, 1676–1938, çev. Siren İdemen. (İstanbul: Metis Yayıncılık, 2018) [in Turkish]
 Jungmann, Albert: Goethes Naturphilosophie zwischen Spinoza und Nietzsche. Studien zur Entwicklung von Goethes Naturphilosophie bis zur Aufnahme von Kants «Kritik der Urteilskraft». (Frankfurt am Main: Peter Lang, 1989) [in German]
 Katz, Gideon: The Pale God: Israeli Secularism and Spinoza's Philosophy of Culture. Translated by Miriam Ron and Jacky Feldman. (Boston: Academic Studies Press, 2011)
 Kavula, Ferdinand Kashula: Propos sur le libéralisme politique et religieux. Dialogue idéal entre John Locke et Baruch Spinoza. (Paris: L'Harmattan, 2014) [in French]
 Keller, Franz: Spinoza und Leibnitz über die Freiheit des menschlichen Willens. (Erlangen: Ferdinand Enke, 1847) [in German]
 Kennedy, Laura M.: Seeking Spinoza: The Spinozistic Origins of Early Psychological Theory in Wundt, James and Freud. (PhD diss., Trinity College Dublin, School of Social Sciences and philosophy, 2019)
 Kenny, Deborah Anne: Anatomies of the Subject: Spinoza and Deleuze. (Ph.D. thesis, Queen Mary University of London, 2006)
 Kettle, Nancy M.: Climate, Neo-Spinozism, and the Ecological Worldview. (PhD diss., University of South Florida, 2013)
 Kischner, M. S.: Spinozism in the Novels of George Eliot: Adam Bede, The Mill on the Floss, and Silas Marner. (Ph.D. diss., University of Washington, 1976)
 Kisser, Thomas (ed.): Metaphysik und Methode Descartes, Spinoza, Leibniz im Vergleich. (Stuttgart: Franz Steiner Verlag, 2010) [in German]
 Klencke, Philipp Hermann: Spinoza, mit Rücksicht auf Kant, Schopenhauer, Göthe und die moderne Naturwissenschaft. (Leipzig: Roßberg, 1882) [in German]
 Klencke, Philipp Hermann: Pessimismus und Schopenhauer, mit Bezug auf Spinoza als Heilmittel des Pessimismus. (Leipzig: Roßberg, 1882) [in German]
 Klencke, Philipp Hermann: Vom phantastischen Pessimismus zum freudigen Realismus: Schopenhauer und Spinoza. (Leipzig: Roßberg, 1882) [in German]
 Klever, Wim: Een nieuwe Spinoza, in veertig facetten. (Amsterdam: Wereldbibliotheek, 1995) [in Dutch]
 Klever, Wim: Mannen rond Spinoza (1650–1700): Presentatie van een emanciperende generatie. (Hilversum: Verloren, 1997) [in Dutch]
 Klever, Wim: The Sphinx: Spinoza Reconsidered in Three Essays. (Vrijstad: DocVision, 2000)
 Klever, Wim: Spinoza classicus. Antieke bronnen van een moderne denker. (Eindhoven: Damon, 2005) [in Dutch]
 Kline, George L. (ed.): Spinoza in Soviet Philosophy. A Series of Essays Selected and Translated and with an Introduction. (New York: The Humanities Press, 1952)
 Kordela, A. Kiarina: $urplus: Spinoza, Lacan. (Albany: State University of New York Press, 2007)
 Kordela, A. Kiarina: Epistemontology in Spinoza – Marx – Freud – Lacan: The (Bio)Power of Structure. (New York: Routledge, 2018)
 Kors, Alan Charles: Naturalism and Unbelief in France, 1650–1729. (Cambridge: Cambridge University Press, 2016)
 Kołakowski, Leszek: The Two Eyes of Spinoza & Other Essays on Philosophers. Translated by Agnieszka Kolakowska et al., edited by Zbigniew Janowski. (South Bend, IN: St. Augustine's Press, 2004) 
 Krösche, Kurt: Wie weit stimmt die Lehre Spinozas vom Parallelismus der göttlichen Attribute überein mit der Theorie vom psychisch-physischen Parallelismus bei Fechner und Fr. Alb. Lange?. (Berlin: Druck von W. Pormetter, 1910) [in German]
 Krop, Henri: Spinoza, een paradoxale icoon van Nederland. (Amsterdam: Prometheus, 2015) [in Dutch]
 Lamarche, Pierre; Rosenkrantz, Max; Sherman, David (eds.): Reading Negri: Marxism in the Age of Empire. (Chicago: Open Court, 2011)
 Lantoine, Jacques-Louis: L'agent automate. Le concept de disposition chez Spinoza. (Ph.D. diss., École Normale Supérieure de Lyon, 2016) [in French]
 Lantoine, Jacques-Louis: Spinoza après Bourdieu. Politique des dispositions. (Paris: Editions de la Sorbonne, 2018) [in French]
 Lapointe, Francis: La lecture deleuzienne de Spinoza. Ou comment Deleuze inscrit sa philosophie de la différence dans l'histoire de la philosophie. (Ph.D. diss., Université Laval, 2016) [in French]
 Lavaert, Sonja: Het perspectief van de multitude: Agamben, Machiavelli, Spinoza, Negri, Virno. (Brussels: VUB Press, 2011) [in Dutch]
 Lavaert, Sonja; Schröder, Winfried (eds.): The Dutch Legacy: Radical Thinkers of the 17th Century and the Enlightenment. (Leiden: Brill, 2016)
 Lazzeri, Christian: Droit, pouvoir et liberté: Spinoza critique de Hobbes. (Paris: Presses Universitaires de France, 1998) [in French]
 Lefebvre, Alexandre: The Image of Law: Deleuze, Bergson, Spinoza. (Stanford, CA: Stanford University Press, 2008)
 Lehmans, Joseph Bernard: Spinoza, sein Lebensbild une seine Philosophie. (Würzburg: F. E. Thein, 1864) [in German]
 Lemaire, Dominique Thiébaut: Passions et raison aujourd'hui à la lumière de Descartes et de Spinoza. (Paris: Le Scribe l'Harmattan, 2018) [in French]
 Levenson, Alan T.; Klein, Roger C.: An Introduction to Modern Jewish Thinkers: From Spinoza to Soloveitchik. (Lanham, MD: Rowman & Littlefield, 2006)
 Levine, Michael P.: Pantheism: A Non-Theistic Concept of Deity. (London: Routledge, 1994)
 Levy, Ze'ev: Baruch or Benedict: On Some Jewish Aspects of Spinoza's Philosophy. (New York: Peter Lang, 1989)
 Levy, Ze'ev: Baruch Spinoza: Seine Aufnahme durch die jüdischen Denker in Deutschland. (Stuttgart: Kohlhammer Verlag, 2001) [in German]
 Levy, Ze'ev; Greenberg, Yudit Kornberg (ed.): From Spinoza to Lévinas: Hermeneutical, Ethical, and Political Issues in Modern and Contemporary Jewish Philosophy. (New York: Peter Lang, 2009)
 Lewkowitz, Julius: Spinoza's Cogitata metaphysica und ihr Verhältnis zu Descartes und zur Scholastik. (Breslau: T. Schatzky, 1902) [in German]
 Lindner, Herbert: Das Problem des Spinozismus im Schaffen Goethes und Herders. (Weimar: Arion, 1960) [in German]
 Liveri, Giuseppe Turco: Nietzsche e Spinoza. Ricostruzione filosofico-storica di un incontro impossibile. (Roma: Armando Editore, 2002) [in Italian]
 Lloyd, Genevieve: Routledge Philosophy Guidebook to Spinoza and the Ethics. (London: Routledge, 1996)
 Lloyd, Genevieve; Gatens, Moira: Collective Imaginings: Spinoza, Past and Present. (London: Routledge, 1999)
 Lodoli, Federico: Spinoza e Nietzsche. Della potenza e le sue determinazioni. (Verona: Ombre Corte, 2012) [in Italian]
 Loeb, Louis E.: From Descartes to Hume: Continental Metaphysics and the Development of Modern Philosophy. (Ithaca, New York: Cornell University Press, 1981)
 Loewe, Johann Heinrich: Die Philosophie Fichtes nach dem Gesamtergebnisse ihrer Entwicklung und in ihrem Verhältnisse zu Kant und Spinoza. Mit einem Anhange: Über den Gottesbegriff Spinoza's und dessen Schicksale. (Stuttgart: Wilhelm Nitzschke, 1862) [in German]
 Loi, Emmanuel: Je devrais me taire: Spinoza, Hölderlin et autres essais. (Paris: Éditions Exils, 2004) [in French]
 Lowe, Abigail Schmidt: Intersections in Immanence: Spinoza, Deleuze, Negri. (MA thesis, University of Nebraska-Lincoln, 2013)
 Luby, Barry J.: Maimonides and Spinoza: Their Sources, Cosmological Metaphysics, and Impact on Modern Thought and Literature. (New York: Las Americas Publishing Co., 1973)
 Macherey, Pierre: In a Materialist Way: Selected Essays. Edited by Warren Montag, translated by Ted Stolze. (New York: Verso, 1998)
 Mack, Michael: Spinoza and the Specters of Modernity: The Hidden Enlightenment of Diversity from Spinoza to Freud. (New York: Continuum, 2010)
 Madanes, Leiser: El árbitro arbitrario. Hobbes, Spinoza y la libertad de expresión. (Buenos Aires: Eudeba, 2001) [in Spanish]
 Manoloff, Philipp: Willensunfreiheit und Erziehungsmöglichkeit (Spinoza, Leibniz, Schopenhauer). (Bern: Scheitlin Spring & Cie, 1904) [in German]
 Mariani, Saverio: Bergson oltre Bergson. La storia della filosofia, la metafisica della durata e il ruolo di Spinoza. (Pisa: ETS, 2018) [in Italian]
 Martin, Jean-Clet: Bréviaire de l'éternité. Entre Vermeer et Spinoza. (Paris: Éditions Léo Scheer, 2011) [in French]
 Martineau, James: A Study of Spinoza. (London: Macmillan, 1882)
 Martins Vilar de Carvalho, André (ed.): O mais potente dos afetos: Spinoza e Nietzsche. (São Paulo: Martins Fontes, 2009) [in Portuguese]
 Marx, Karl: Quaderno Spinoza 1841, a cura di B. Bongiovanni. (Torino: Bollati Boringhieri, 1987) [in Italian]
 Marx, Karl: Cuaderno Spinoza. Traducción, estudio preliminar y notas de Nicolás González Varela. (Barcelona: Montesinos, 2012) [in Spanish]
 Mastropierro, Enrico: Il corpo e l'evento. Sullo «Spinoza» di Deleuze. (Milano: Mimesis, 2012) [in Italian]
 Matheron, Alexandre (ed.): Études sur Spinoza et les philosophies de l'âge classique. (Lyon: ENS Éditions, 2011) [in French]
 Meckenstock, Günter: Deterministische Ethik und kritische Theologie: Die Auseinandersetzung des frühen Schleiermacher mit Kant und Spinoza, 1789–1794 [Schleiermacher-Archiv; Bd. 5]. (Berlin: Walter de Gruyter, 1988) [in German]
 Meinsma, K.O.: Spinoza en zijn kring: Historisch-kritische studiën over de Hollandsche vrijgeesten. (Den Haag: Martinus Nijhoff, 1896) [in Dutch]
 Meinsma, K.O.: Spinoza und sein Kreis: Historisch-kritische Studien über holländische Freigeister [Translated from the Dutch]. (Berlin: K. Schnabel, 1909) [in German]
 Meinsma, K.O.: Spinoza et son cercle: Étude critique historique sur les hétérodoxes hollandais [Translated from the Dutch by S. Roosenburg]. (Paris: Vrin, 1983) [in French]
 Melamed, S. M.: Spinoza and Buddha: Visions of a Dead God. (Chicago: University of Chicago Press, 1933)
 Méchoulan, Henry: Amsterdam au temps de Spinoza. Argent et liberté. (Paris: Presses Universitaires de France, 1990) [in French]
 Méchoulan, Henry: Être juif à Amsterdam au temps de Spinoza. (Paris: Albin Michel, 1991) [in French]
 Méchoulan, Henry: Amsterdam ten tijde van Spinoza. Geld en vrijheid. Vertaald uit het Frans door Jelle Noorman. (Amsterdam: Uitgeverij De Arbeiderspers, 1992) [in Dutch]
 Méchoulan, Henry: Gli ebrei ad Amsterdam all'epoca di Spinoza. Traduzione di Piero Dello Strologo. (Genova: ECIG, 1998) [in Italian]
 Méchoulan, Henry: Le droit et le sacré chez Spinoza. (Paris: Berg International, 2013) [in French]
 Michelini, Francesca: Sostanza e assoluto. La funzione di Spinoza nella «Scienza della logica» di Hegel. (Bologna: EDB, 2004) [in Italian]
 Mignini, Filippo: Introduzione a Spinoza. (Roma/Bari: Laterza, 1983) [in Italian]
 Miller, Jon: Spinoza and the Stoics. (Cambridge: Cambridge University Press, 2015)
 Miqueu, Christophe: Spinoza, Locke, et l'idée de citoyenneté. Une génération républicaine à l'aube des Lumières. (Paris: Garnier Classique, 2012) [in French]
 Monaco, Davide: Religione e filosofia secondo Leo Strauss. Il per or so da Spinoza a Maimonide. (Vatican City: Pontificia Università Urbaniana, 2018) [in Italian]
 Montag, Warren: Cuerpos, Masas, Poder. Spinoza y sus contemporáneos. Traducción de Aurelio Sainz Pezonaga. (Madrid : Tierradenadie Ediciones, 2005) [in Spanish] 
 Montano, Aniello: Ontologia e storia. Vico versus Spinoza. (Naples: Bibliopolis, 2015) [in Italian]
 Moreau, Pierre-François; Ramond, Charles (eds.): Lectures de Spinoza. (Paris: Ellipses, 2006) [in French]
 Morfino, Vittorio: Substantia sive organismus. Immagine e funzione teorica di Spinoza negli scritti jenesi di Hegel. (Milan: Guerini e Associati, 1997) [in Italian]
 Morfino, Vittorio: Spinoza e il non contemporaneo. (Verona: Ombre Corte, 2009) [in Italian]
 Morfino, Vittorio: Le temps et l'occasion: La rencontre Spinoza–Machiavel. (Paris: Classiques Garnier, 2012) [in French]
 Morfino, Vittorio: Genealogia di un pregiudizio. L'immagine di Spinoza in Germania da Leibniz a Marx. (Hildesheim: Georg Olms Verlag AG, 2016) [in Italian]
 Morgan, Michael L. (ed.): The Essential Spinoza: Ethics and Related Writings. Translated by Samuel Shirley. (Indianapolis: Hackett Publishing, 2002)
 Mori, Gianluca: L'ateismo dei moderni. Filosofia e negazione di Dio da Spinoza a D'Holbach. (Roma: Carocci, 2016) [in Italian]
 Morrow, Jeffrey L.: Three Skeptics and the Bible: La Peyrère, Hobbes, Spinoza, and the Reception of Modern Biblical Criticism. (Eugene, OR: Pickwick Publications, 2016)
 Moss, Arthur B.: Bruno and Spinoza. (London: Watts & Co., 1885)
 Mühlhoff, Rainer: Immersive Macht: Affekttheorie nach Spinoza und Foucault. (Frankfurt: Campus Verlag, 2018) [in German]
 Myers, Henry Alonzo: An Introduction to the Timely and Synoptic Elements of Metaphysics: Illustrated by the Logic (Synoptic Element) and the History (Timely Element) of the Conceptions of Perspectives and the Metaphysical Object Appearing in the Logos of Heraclitus, the Attributes and Substance of Spinoza, the Perspectival Monads of Leibniz, the Categories and Absolute of Hegel, and the Concepts and Intuition of Bergson. (PhD diss., Cornell University, 1933)
 Myers, Henry Alonzo: The Spinoza-Hegel Paradox: A Study of the Choice Between Traditional Idealism and Systematic Pluralism. (Ithaca, NY: Cornell University Press, 1944)
 Naether, Hans: The Pantheism of Goethe in Its Relation to that of Spinoza. (MA thesis, State University of Iowa, 1918)
 Nelson, Alan (ed.): A Companion to Rationalism. (Oxford: Blackwell Publishing, 2005)
 Neto, Leon Farhi: Masse & Multitude: À partir de Freud, Canetti & Spinoza. (Paris: L'Harmattan, 2019) [in French]
 Neu, Jerome: Emotion, Thought and Therapy: A Study of Hume and Spinoza and the Relationship of Philosophical Theories of the Emotions to Psychological Theories of Therapy. (Berkeley, CA: University of California Press, 1977)
 Néria, William: Plotin, Shankara, Spinoza:  Le dépassement de la raison et l'expérience de l'absolu. (Paris: Les Deux Océans, 2014) [in French]
 Nutkiewicz, Michael E.: The Impact of Mechanical Philosophy on Early Modern Political Theory: Hobbes, Spinoza, Pufendorf, and Vico. (PhD diss., University of California, Los Angeles, 1978)
 Ochs, Carol R. B: The Ontological Argument in Descartes, Spinoza and Leibniz. (PhD diss., Brandeis University, 1968)
 Oko, Adolph S.: The Spinoza Bibliography. With preface by Dorothy Kuhn Oko and introduction by Horace M. Kallen (Boston: G. K. Hall & Co., 1964)
 Orelli, Conrad von: Spinoza's Leben und Lehre. Nebst einem Abrisse der Schelling'schen und Hegel'schen Philosophie. (Aarau: H.R. Sauerländer, 1843) [in German]
 Pablos Escalante, Raúl E. de: La filosofía vivida. Pensamiento y transformación en Spinoza y Nietzsche. (Ph.D. diss., Universidad Complutense de Madrid, 2016) [in Spanish]
 Pascucci, Margherita: La potenza della povertà. Marx legge Spinoza. (Verona: Ombre Corte, 2006) [in Italian]
 Pascucci, Margherita: Causa sui: Saggio sul capitale e il virtuale. (Verona: Ombre Corte, 2010) [in Italian]
 Pascucci, Margherita: Potentia of Poverty: Marx Reads Spinoza. (New York: Palgrave Macmillan, 2017)
 Pätzold, Detlev: Spinoza, Aufklärung, Idealismus: Die Substanz der Moderne [2nd ed.]. (Assen: Van Gorcum, 2002) [in German]
 Peden, Knox: Reason without Limits: Spinozism as Anti-Phenomenology in Twentieth-Century French Thought. (Ph.D. thesis, University of California, Berkeley, 2009)
 Peden, Knox: Spinoza Contra Phenomenology: French Rationalism from Cavaillès to Deleuze. (Stanford, CA: Stanford University Press, 2014) 
 Petrarca, Giacomo: La legge per la legge. Paolo, Spinoza, Rosenzweig. (Livorno: Belforte Salomone, 2018) [in Italian]
 Pérez Cortés, Francisco; Pérez Cortés, Sergio: La razón autocrítica: El conocimiento en Spinoza y Hegel. (Ciudad de México: Universidad Autónoma Metropolitana, 1989) [in Spanish]
 Pfleiderer, Otto: Geschichte der Religionsphilosophie von Spinoza bis auf die Gegenwart, 3., erweiterte Auflage. (Berlin: Georg Reimer, 1893) [in German]
 Pfleiderer, Otto: The Philosophy of Religion on the Basis of its History; Part 1: The History of the Philosophy of Religion from Spinoza to the Present Day; Vol. 1: Spinoza to Schleiermacher. Translated from the German by Alexander Stewart and Allan Menzies. (London: Williams & Norgate, 1886–1887)
 Phemister, Pauline: The Rationalists: Descartes, Spinoza and Leibniz. (Malden, MA: Polity Press, 2006)
 Picton, James Allanson: Pantheism: Its Story and Significance. (London: Constable & Co., 1905)
 Polka, Brayton: Between Philosophy and Religion: Spinoza, the Bible, and Modernity, Vol. 1: Hermeneutics and Ontology. (Lanham, MD: Lexington Books, 2006)
 Polka, Brayton: Between Philosophy and Religion: Spinoza, the Bible, and Modernity, Vol. 2: Politics and Ethics. (Lanham, MD: Lexington Books, 2007)
 Pollock, Frederick: Spinoza: His Life and Philosophy. (London: C. Kegan Paul & Co., 1880; New York: American Scholar Publications, 1966)
 Popkin, Richard H.: The History of Scepticism from Erasmus to Spinoza. (Berkeley, Los Angeles: University of California Press, 1979)
 Pozzi, Patrizia: «De vita solitaria»: Petrarca e Spinoza. (Milano: Mimesis, 2017) [in Italian]
 Préposiet, Jean: Bibliographie Spinoziste. (Paris: Les Belles Lettres, 1973) [in French]
 Proietti, Omero (ed.): Agnostos theos. Il carteggio Spinoza-Oldenburg (1675–1676). (Macerata: Edizioni Quodlibet, 2006) [in Italian]
 Proietti, Omero; Licata, Giovanni (trans., eds.): Il carteggio Van Gent-Tschirnhaus (1679–1690). Storia, cronistoria, contesto dell'«editio posthuma» spinoziana. (Macerata: EUM, 2013) [in Italian]
 Rábade Romeo, Sergio: Obras III. El racionalismo. Descartes y Espinosa. Edición de María Luisa de la Cámara. (Madrid: Editorial Trotta/CEU Universidad San Pablo, 2006) [in Spanish]
 Ramond, Charles; Stetter, Jack: Spinoza in Twenty-First-Century American and French Philosophy: Metaphysics, Philosophy of Mind, Moral and Political Philosophy. (London: Bloomsbury Academic, 2019) 
 Rapetti, Elena: La stanza degli specchi. Descartes e Spinoza nella corrispondenza di Pierre-Daniel Huet. (Mantova: Universitas Studiorum, 2018) [in Italian]
 Rappaport, Samuel: Spinoza und Schopenhauer: Eine kritisch-historische Untersuchung mit Berücksichtigung des unedierten Schopenhauerschen Nachlasses. (Berlin: R. Gaertners, 1899) [in German]
 Ravà, Adolfo: Studi su Spinoza e Fichte. A cura di Enrico Opocher. (Milano: A. Giuffrè, 1958) [in Italian]
 Ravven, Heidi M.: The Self Beyond Itself: An Alternative History of Ethics, the New Brain Sciences, and the Myth of Free Will. (New York: The New Press, 2013)
 Rehorn, Karl: G. E. Lessing's Stellung zur Philosophie des Spinoza. (Frankfurt am Main: Moritz Diesterweg, 1877) [in German]
 Reichenau, Wilhelm von: Die monistische Philosophie von Spinoza bis auf unsere Tage. (Köln-Leipzig: Verlag von Eduard Heinrich Mayer, 1881) [in German]
 Ricard, Hubert: De Spinoza à Lacan. Autre chose et la mystique. (Paris: EME Éditions, 2015) [in French]
 Ricchiari, Massimo: Spinoza e Cristo: la liberazione come salvezza. (PhD diss., Università degli Studi di Napoli Federico II, 2017) [in Italian]
 Rinaldi, Giacomo: Due interpreti dell'Etica di Spinoza: Harold H. Joachim e Karl Jaspers. (Roma: Aracne Editrice, 2017) [in Italian]
 Röd, Wolfgang: Geschichte der Philosophie, Band VII: Die Philosophie der Neuzeit 1: Von Francis Bacon bis Spinoza. (München: C. H. Beck, 1978) [in German]
 Roelofsz, C.: De beteekenis van Christus voor Spinoza. (Zeist: J. Ploegsma, 1938) [in Dutch]
 Roth, Leon: Spinoza, Descartes and Maimonides. (Oxford: Clarendon, 1924)
 Roth, Leon: Spinoza. (Boston: Little, Brown & Co., 1929)
 Rottner, Eli: Aus Spinozas Heimat und Constantin Brunners letzter Zufluchtsstätte. (Dortmund: E.Rudnicki, 1972) [in German]
 Rubin, Salomon: Spinoza und Maimonides. Ein psychologisch-philosophisches Antitheton. (Wien: Herzfeld & Bauer, 1868) [in German]
 Russell, Bertrand: A History of Western Philosophy [Book 3: Modern Philosophy; Chapter X: Spinoza]. (London: George Allen & Unwin, 1946)
 Ruvo, Vincenzo De: Il problema della verità da Spinoza a Hume. Con due saggi su La possibilità come attualità assoluta e L'eticità della logica. (Padova: CEDAM, 1950) [in Italian]
 Saada, Julie (ed.): Hobbes, Spinoza ou les politiques de la Parole. Critique de la sécularisation et usages de l'histoire sainte à l'âge classique. (Lyon: ENS Éditions, 2017) [in French]
 Sanekli, Monia: L'inconscient – Freud: Spinoza, Schopenhauer, Nietzsche. (Saint-Denis: Connaissances et Savoirs, 2016) [in French]
 Santinelli, Cristina: Spinoza in Italia. Bibliografia degli scritti italiani su Spinoza dal 1675 al 1982. (Urbino: Pubblicazioni dell'Università degli Studi di Urbino, 1983) [in Italian]
 Santinelli, Cristina: Mente e corpo. Studi su Cartesio e Spinoza. (Urbino: Quattroventi, 2000) [in Italian]
 Scandella, Maurizio: La determinazione dell'esistenza: Nietzsche e Spinoza. (Ph.D. diss., Università di Bologna, 2013) [in Italian]
 Schmaltz, Tad M.: The Metaphysics of the Material World: Suárez, Descartes, Spinoza. (New York: Oxford University Press, 2020)
 Schmidt, Andreas: Göttliche Gedanken. Zur Metaphysik der Erkenntnis bei Descartes, Malebranche, Spinoza und Leibniz. (Frankfurt am Main: Vittorio Klostermann, 2009) [in German]
 Schmidt, Paul Wilhelm: Spinoza und Schleiermacher. Die Geschichte ihrer Systeme und ihre gegenseitiges Verhältniß. Ein dogmengeschichtlicher Versuch. (Berlin: Georg Reimer, 1868) [in German]
 Schneege, Gerhard: Zu Goethes Spinozismus. (Breslau: Druck von O. Gutsmann, 1910) [in German]
 Schneider, Monique: La cause amoureuse: Freud, Spinoza, Racine. (Paris: Le Seuil, 2015) [in French]
 Schulz, Ortrun: Wille und Intellekt bei Schopenhauer und Spinoza. (Ph.D diss., Hannover, 1993; Frankfurt am Main: Peter Lang, 1993) [in German]
 Schulz, Ortrun: Schopenhauers Anleihen bei Spinoza. (Norderstedt: Books on Demand, 2014) [in German]
 Scribano, Emanuela: Da Descartes a Spinoza. Percorsi della teologia razionale nel Seicento. (Milano: Franco Angeli, 1988) [in Italian]
 Scribano, Emanuela: Angeli e beati. Modelli di conoscenza da Tommaso a Spinoza. (Bari: Laterza, 2006) [in Italian]
 Scribano, Emanuela: Macchine con la mente. Fisiologia e metafisica tra Cartesio e Spinoza. (Roma: Carocci, 2015) [in Italian]
 Scruton, Roger: Spinoza. (New York: Oxford University Press, 1986)
 Scruton, Roger: Spinoza: A Very Short Introduction. (Oxford: Oxford University Press, 2002)
 Scruton, Roger: Spinoza, çev. Hakan Gür. (Ankara: Dost Kitabevi Yayınları, 2007) [in Turkish]
 Seidel, Helmut: Marxismus und Spinozismus: Materialien einer wissenschaftlichen Konferenz. (Leipzig: Karl-Marx Universität, 1981) [in German]
 Senn, Marcel: Spinoza und die deutsche Rechtswissenschaft. Eine historische Studie zum Rezeptionsdefizit des Spinozismus in der Rechtswissenschaft des deutschsprachigen Kulturraumes [Zürcher Studien zur Rechtsgeschichte; Bd. 22]. (Zürich: Schulthess, 1991) [in German]
 Seung, T. K.: Goethe, Nietzsche, and Wagner: Their Spinozan Epics of Love and Power. (Lanham, MD: Lexington Books, 2006)
 Severijn, Johannes: Spinoza en de Gereformeerde Theologie zijner dagen. (Utrecht: J. van Druten, 1919) [in Dutch]
 Sgambato-Ledoux, Isabelle: Oreste et Néron: Spinoza, Freud et le mal. (Paris: Classiques Garnier, 2017) [in French]
 Signoracci, Gino: Hegel on Indian Philosophy: Spinozism, Romanticism, Eurocentrism. (Ph.D. diss., University of New Mexico, 2017)
 Silva, Cíntia Vieira da: Corpo e pensamento: Alianças conceituais entre Deleuze e Espinosa. (Campinas, SP: Editora da UNICAMP, 2013) [in Portuguese]
 Smith, Brandon: The Un-Stoic Spinoza: An Analysis of Spinoza, Aristotle, and Epicurus's Accounts of Pleasure. (M.A. thesis, Carleton University, 2018)
 Souza, José Fernando Vidal de: A (in)existência de Deus: Diálogos improváveis e impertinentes entre Espinosa, Nietzsche e Sartre. (Florianópolis, SC: Qualis Editora e Comércio de Livros, 2019) [in Portuguese]
 Spriestersbach, Helga: Die Substanz bei Spinoza und Leibniz [Philosophie, Naturwissenschaft und Technik]. (Berlin: Frank & Timme, 2015) [in German]
 Sprink, Walter: Spinoza und Fechner: Ein Beitrag zu einer vergleichenden Untersuchung der Lehren Spinozas und Fechners. (Breslau: Druck von Wilh. Gottl. Korn, 1912) [in German]
 Stein, Ludwig: Leibniz und Spinoza: Ein Beitrag zur Entwicklungsgeschichte der Leibnizischen Philosophie. (Berlin: Georg Reimer, 1890) [in German]
 Steinberg, Diane: On Spinoza. (Belmont, CA: Wadsworth, 2000)
 Stewart, Christine Anne: Aroused by Unreadable Questions: Vico, Spinoza and the Poetry of Lisa Robertson and Catriona Strang. (PhD diss., University of British Columbia, 2005)
 Strack, Rudolf: Notwendigkeit und Freiheit. Eine Erläuterung der Lehre Spinozas über das relative Verstandesdenken (ratio). (Berlin: Ebering, 1921) [in German]
 Strazzoni, Andrea: Dutch Cartesianism and the Birth of Philosophy of Science: A Reappraisal of the Function of Philosophy from Regius to 's Gravesande, 1640–1750. (Berlin: De Gruyter, 2018)
 Strickler, Nina: The Problem of the Absolute: A Study in Spinoza, Hegel and Wittgenstein. (PhD diss., DePaul University, 1973)
 Suhamy, Ariel: Pas à pas avec Spinoza. (Paris: Ellipses, 2011) [in French]
 Suhamy, Ariel: Godescalc, le moine du destin (IXe siècle): De Charlemagne à Spinoza, le procès de la prédestination. (Paris: Alma Éditeur, 2016) [in French]
 Terdjman, Jean-Michel: Erreur, ignorance et illusion d'après Spinoza et Sri Aurobindo. (Paris: Les Deux Océans, 1995) [in French]
 Theilhaber, Felix A.: Dein Reich komme! Ein chiliastischer Roman aus der Zeit Rembrandts und Spinozas. (Berlin: C.A. Schwetschke & Sohn, 1924) [in German]
 Thissen, Siebe: De spinozisten: Wijsgerige beweging in Nederland (1850–1907) [The Spinozists: Philosophical Movement in the Netherlands (1850–1907)]. (Den Haag: SDU, 2000) [in Dutch]
 Thomas, Henry: Understanding the Great Philosophers. (Garden City, N.Y.: Doubleday, 1962)
 Thomas, Karl: Herbart – Spinoza – Kant. Dornige Studien und Versuche. Historische Beiträge zur Philosophie. (Langensalza: Beyer, 1875) [in German]
 Timm, Hermann: Gott und die Freiheit: Studien zur Religionsphilosophie der Goethezeit, Band 1: Die Spinozarenaissance. (Frankfurt am Main: Vittorio Klostermann, 1974) [in German]
 Trampe, Adolf: Goethe und Spinoza. Ein Beitrag zur Darstellung der Goetheschen Weltanschauung. (Fulda: Fuldaer Actiendruckerei, 1911) [in German]
 Tresmontant, Claude: L'opposition métaphysique au monothéisme hébreu: de Spinoza à Heidegger. (Paris: O.E.I.L., 1986) [in French]
 Uhlich, Rudolph: Vergleichende Darstellung der Gotteslehren von Spinoza und Malebranche. (Döbeln, 1903) [in German]
 Vallée, Gérard (ed.): The Spinoza Conversations between Lessing and Jacobi: Text with Excerpts from the Ensuing Controversy. Translated from the German by Gérard Vallée, J. B. Lawson and C. G. Chapple. (Lanham, MD: University Press of America, 1988)
 Van Bunge, Wiep (ed.): From Stevin to Spinoza: An Essay on Philosophy in the Seventeenth-Century Dutch Republic. (Leiden: Brill, 2001)
 Van Bunge, Wiep (ed.): The Early Enlightenment in the Dutch Republic, 1650–1750. (Leiden: Brill, 2003)
 Van Bunge, Wiep: De Nederlandse Republiek, Spinoza en de Radicale Verlichting. (Brussel: VUBPress, 2010) [in Dutch]
 Van Bunge, Wiep (ed.): From Bayle to the Batavian Revolution: Essays on Philosophy in the Eighteenth-Century Dutch Republic. (Leiden: Brill, 2018)
 Van Buuren, Maarten: De essentie van Spinoza. (Amsterdam: ISVW Uitgevers, 2016) [in Dutch]
 Van Buuren, Maarten: Spinoza: Vijf wegen naar de vrijheid. (Amsterdam: Ambo/Anthos, 2016) [in Dutch]
 Van Buuren, Maarten: Spinoza: Zijn filosofie in vijftig sleutelwoorden. (Amsterdam: Ambo/Anthos, 2019) [in Dutch]
 Van Cauter, Jo: Spinoza on History, Christ, and Lights Untamable. (Ph.D. diss., Ghent University, 2016)
 Van der Burg, Floris: Davidson and Spinoza: Mind, Matter and Morality. (Burlington, VT: Ashgate, 2007)
 Van der Tak, Willem Gerard: Spinozistische Gedachten in Goethe's Faust. (Leiden: E.J. Brill, 1950) [in Dutch]
 Van der Werf, Theo; Siebrand, H.; Westerveen, C. A: Spinoza Bibliography, 1971–1983. (Leiden: Brill, 1984)
 Vaysse, Jean-Marie: Totalité et finitude: Spinoza et Heidegger. (Paris: Vrin, 2004) [in French]
 Verbeek, Theo: Descartes and the Dutch: Early Reactions to Cartesian Philosophy, 1637–1650. (Carbondale: Southern Illinois University Press, 1992)
 Vinci, Paolo; Tenenbaum, Katja (eds.): Filosofia e ebraismo. Da Spinoza a Levinas. (Firenze: Giuntina 1993) [in Italian]
 Vincieri, Paolo: Natura umana e dominio. Machiavelli, Hobbes, Spinoza. (Ravenna: Longo Angelo, 1984) [in Italian]
 Vinolo, Stéphane: Par-dessus le marché Spinoza, Smith, Derrida, Girard [La transparence est l'obstacle, 3]. (Paris: L'Harmattan, 2018) [in French]
 Vloemans, Antoon: Spinoza: De mensch het leven en het werk. (Den Haag: N.V.H.P. Leopold's Uitgevers-Maatschappij, 1931) [in Dutch]
 Vloemans, Antoon: Inleiding tot Spinoza. (Den Haag: W.P. Van Stockum en Zoon, 1953) [in Dutch]
 Vollrath, W.: Die Auseinandersetzung Herders mit Spinoza. (Darmstadt: C.F. Winter, 1911) [in German]
 Voronoff, Timothy: Ruling Passion:The Use of Myth and Narrative in Place of Reason in Politics; Spinoza's Proposed Solution to Hobbes' Science of the Passions. (Ph.D. diss., New School University, 2008)
 Wagener, Bruno: Über die Beziehungen Fichtes zu Spinoza und Leibniz. Eine kritisch-philosophische Untersuchung. (Borna: R. Noske, 1914) [in German]
 Walther, Manfred; von Wolzogen, Hanna Delf; et al. (eds.): Spinoza in der europäischen Geistesgeschichte. (Berlin: Hentrich, 1994) [in German]
 Walther, Manfred (ed.): Gehorsam oder Erkenntnis: Die Philosophie Spinozas in religionsphilosophischer Perspektive [Spinoza-Studien; Band 1]. (Heidelberg: Universitätsverlag Winter GmbH, 2018) [in German]
 Walther, Manfred (ed.): Natur, Recht und Freiheit: Spinozas Theorie von Recht, Staat und Politik im Kontext der Frühen Neuzeit [Spinoza-Studien; Band 2]. (Heidelberg: Universitätsverlag Winter GmbH, 2018) [in German]
 Walther, Manfred (ed.): Spinoza in Deutschland: Von G. W. Leibniz bis zu Carl Schmitt: Philosophie – Wissenschaft – Ideologie [Spinoza-Studien; Band 3]. (Heidelberg: Universitätsverlag Winter GmbH, 2018) [in German]
 Ward, Lee: Modern Democracy and the Theological-Political Problem in Spinoza, Rousseau, and Jefferson. (New York: Palgrave MacMillan, 2014)
 Warnecke, Friedrich: Goethe, Spinoza und Jacobi. (Weimar: Hermann Böhlaus Nachfolger, 1908) [in German]
 Wegenast, Margarethe: Hölderlins Spinoza-Rezeption und ihre Bedeutung für die Konzeption des "Hyperion". (Tübingen: Niemeyer, 1990) [in German]
 Wielema, M. R.: The March of the Libertines: Spinozists and the Dutch Reformed Church (1660–1750). (Hilversum: Uitgeverij Verloren, 2004)
 Wilkins, Adam: Modes, Monads and Nomads: Individuals in Spinoza, Leibniz and Deleuze. (Ph.D. diss., Stony Brook University, 2008)
 Willis, Robert: Benedict de Spinoza: His Life, Correspondence, and Ethics. (London: Trübner & Co., 1870)
 Wolfson, Harry Austryn: The Philosophy of Spinoza: Unfolding the Latent Processes of His Reasoning [2 vols.]. (Cambridge, MA: Harvard University Press, 1934)
 Wolfson, Harry Austryn: From Philo to Spinoza: Two Studies in Religious Philosophy. Edited by Isadore Twersky. (New York: Behrman House, 1977) 
 Woolhouse, Roger: Descartes, Spinoza, Leibniz: The Concept of Substance in Seventeenth Century Metaphysics. (London: Routledge, 1993)
 Wulf, Jan-Hendrik: Spinoza in der jüdischen Aufklärung. Baruch Spinoza als diskursive Grenzfigur des Jüdischen und Nichtjüdischen in den Texten der Haskala von Moses Mendelssohn bis Salomon Rubin und in frühen zionistischen Zeugnissen. (Berlin: De Gruyter, 2012) [in German]
 Wurzer, W. S.: Nietzsche und Spinoza. (Meisenheim am Glan: Anton Hain, 1975) [in German]
 Yasa, Metin: İbn Arabî ve Spinoza'da Varlık. (Ankara: Elis Yayınları, 2003) [in Turkish]
 Youpa, Andrew: Descartes and Spinoza on Freedom and Virtue. (Ph.D. diss., University of California, Irvine, 2002) 
 Zaltieri, Cristina: Il divenire della Bildung in Nietzsche e in Spinoza. (PhD diss., Università degli Studi di Bergamo, 2013) [in Italian]
 Zac, Sylvain: L'idée de vie dans la philosophie de Spinoza. (Paris: PUF, 1963) [in French]
 Zac, Sylvain: Spinoza et l'interprétation de l'Écriture. (Paris: PUF, 1965) [in French]
 Zac, Sylvain: La morale de Spinoza. (Paris: PUF, 1972) [in French]
 Zac, Sylvain: Philosophie, théologie, politique dans l'œuvre de Spinoza. (Paris: Vrin, 1979) [in French]
 Zac, Sylvain: Essais spinozistes. (Paris: Vrin, 1985) [in French]
 Zac, Sylvain: Spinoza en Allemagne: Mendelssohn, Lessing et Jacobi. (Paris: Méridiens Klincksieck, 1989) [in French]
 Zarka, Yves-Charles: Liberté et nécessité chez Hobbes et ses contemporains: Descartes, Cudworth, Spinoza, Leibniz. (Paris: Vrin, 2012) [in French]

Specialized studies
 Abdo-Ferez, Maria Cecilia: Die Produktivität der Macht. Eine Analyse der politischen Theorie von Baruch Spinoza. (Berlin: Logos Verlag, 2007) [in German]
 Adinolfi, Massimo: Continuando Spinoza. Un'esercitazione filosofica. (Roma: Editori Internazionali Riuniti, 2012) [in Italian]
 Adkins, Brent: True Freedom: Spinoza's Practical Philosophy. (Lanham, MD: Lexington Books, 2009)
 Aenishänslin, Markus: Le Tractatus de Wittgenstein et l'Éthique de Spinoza. Étude de comparaison structurale. (Basel: Birkhäuser, 1993) [in French]
 Agrest, Diana Cohen: Spinoza, una cartografía de la Ética. (Buenos Aires: Eudeba, 2015)  [in Spanish]
 Akal, Cemal Bâli: Varolma direnci ve özerklik. Bir hak kuramı için Spinoza'yla. (Ankara: Dost Kitabevi Yayınları, 2004) [in Turkish]
 Akal, Cemal Bâli: Özgürlüğün Geleceği Yoktur. Edebiyatta Spinoza. (Ankara: Dost Kitabevi Yayınları, 2006) [in Turkish]
 Akal, Cemal Bâli: Spinoza Günleri: Teolojik-Politik İnceleme Etrafında. (İstanbul: İstanbul Bilgi Üniversitesi Yayınları, 2009) [in Turkish]
 Akal, Cemal Bâli; Ergün, Reyda: Spinoza Günleri 2: Yeni Dünyadan Eski Dünyaya. (İstanbul: İstanbul Bilgi Üniversitesi Yayınları, 2011) [in Turkish]
 Albiac, Gabriel: La sinagoga vacía. Un estudio de las fuentes marranas del espinosismo. (Madrid: Hiperión, 1987) [in Spanish]
 Albiac, Gabriel: La Synagogue vide. Les sources marranes du spinozisme. [Trans. Marie-Lucie Copete & Jean-Frédéric Schaub]. (Paris: PUF, 1994) [in French]
 Alexander, Samuel: Spinoza ve Zaman, çev. Berk Yaylım. (Ankara: Fol Kitap, 2019) [in Turkish]
 Almog, Joseph: Everything in Its Right Place: Spinoza and Life by the Light of Nature. (Oxford: Oxford University Press, 2014) 
 Alquié, Ferdinand: Nature et vérité dans la philosophie de Spinoza. (Paris: Centre de Documentation Universitaire, 1965) [in French]
 Alquié, Ferdinand: Servitude et liberté selon Spinoza. (Paris: Centre de Documentation Universitaire, 1967) [in French]
 Alquié, Ferdinand: Le rationalisme de Spinoza. (Paris: PUF, 1981) [in French]
 Alquié, Ferdinand: Il razionalismo di Spinoza. Traduzione di Marco Ravera. (Milano: Ugo Mursia Editore, 1987) [in Italian]
 Alquié, Ferdinand: Leçons sur Spinoza. (Paris: Éditions de La Table Ronde, 2003) [in French]
 Althusser, Louis: L'unica tradizione materialista: Spinoza. A cura di Vittorio Morfino. (Milano: CUEM, 1998) [in Italian]
 Altkirch, Ernst: Maledictus und Benedictus: Spinoza im Urteil des Volkes und der Geistigen bis auf Constantin Brunner. (Leipzig: F. Meiner, 1924) [in German]
 Amann, Francis: Ganzes und Teil: Wahrheit und Erkennen bei Spinoza [Schriftenreihe der Spinoza-Gesellschaft; Band 9]. (Würzburg: Königshausen & Neumann, 2000) [in German]
 Andrieu, Catherine: De l'éternité du mode fini dans l'Ethique de Spinoza – "Le Chien constellation céleste et le chien animal aboyant". (Paris: L'Harmattan, 2009) [in French]
 Angelillo, Giuseppe D'Ambrosio: Spinoza non conosce il male. (Bari: Acquaviva, 2003) [in Italian]
 Ansaldi, Saverio: Infini, désir, multitude: Spinoza et la pensée baroque de la puissance. (Thèse de doctorat en Philosophie, Université Paris-Sorbonne/Paris IV, 1998) [in French]
 Ansaldi, Saverio: Spinoza et le baroque: Infini, désir, multitude. (Paris: Éditions Kimé, 2001) [in French]
 Ansaldi, Saverio: Spinoza et la Renaissance [Travaux et documents du Groupe de Recherches Spinozistes, Nº12]. (Paris: Presses de l'Université Paris-Sorbonne, 2007) [in French]
 Ansay, Pierre: Spinoza peut nous sauver la vie. Un traité de philosophie pratique. (Charleroi: Éditions Couleur livres, 2011) [in French]
 Ansay, Pierre: Spinoza au ras de nos pâquerettes. (Brussels: Éditions Couleur livres, 2016) [in French]
 Ansay, Pierre: Le cœur de Spinoza. Vivre sans haine. (Brussels: Éditions Couleur livres, 2019) [in French]
 Apel, Walter Georg: Spinozas Verhältnis zum ontologischen Beweise. (Leipzig: Hartmann & Wolf, 1911) [in German]
 Arıcan, Musa Kazım: Spinoza'nın Tanrı Anlayışı: Panteizm, Ateizm ve Panenteizm Bağlamında. (İstanbul: İz. Yayıncılık, 2004) [in Turkish]
 Arıcan, Musa Kazım: Spinoza Felsefesi Üzerine Yazılar. (Ankara: Divan Kitap Yayınları, 2015) [in Turkish]
 Atlan, Henri: Spinoza et la biologie actuelle. (Ph.D. diss., Université Paris 1 Panthéon-Sorbonne, 2017) [in French]
 Atlan, Henri: Cours de philosophie biologique et cognitiviste: Spinoza et la biologie actuelle. (Paris: Éditions Odile Jacob, 2018) [in French]
 Aubert de Versé, Noël: L'impie convaincu ou dissertation contre Spinoza. A cura e con un saggio introduttivo di Fiormichele Benigni. (Roma: Edizioni di Storia e Letteratura, 2015) [in Italian]
 Audié, Fabrice: Spinoza et les mathématiques [Travaux et documents du Groupe de Recherches Spinozistes, Nº11]. (Paris: Presses de l'Université Paris-Sorbonne, 2005) [in French]
 Audié, Fabrice: Spinoza: Problèmes de l'idée vraie. Préface de Pierre-François Moreau. (Paris: L'Harmattan, 2014) [in French]
 Bab, Julius: Rembrandt und Spinoza. Ein Doppelbildnis im deutsch-jüdischen Raum. (Berlin: Philo-Verlag, 1934) [in German]
 Bäck, Leo: Spinozas erste Einwirkungen auf Deutschland. (Berlin: Mayer & Müller, 1895) [in German]
 Baggi, Paolo Giovanni: Geometria e metodo tra Cartesio e Spinoza. (PhD diss., Università di Bologna, 2013) [in Italian]
 Balanuye, Çetin: Spinoza'nın Sevinci Nereden Geliyor? Reddedilemeyecek Bir Felsefi Teklif. (İstanbul: Ayrıntı Yayınları, 2017) [in Turkish]
 Balanuye, Çetin: Spinoza: Bir Hakikat İfadesi. (İstanbul: Say Yayınları, 2012) [in Turkish]
 Balet, Leo: Rembrandt and Spinoza. (New York: Philosophical Library, 1962)
 Balibar, Étienne: Spinoza et la politique. (Paris: Presses Universitaires de France, 1985) [in French]
 Balibar, Étienne: Spinoza and Politics. Translated from the French by Peter Snowdon. (New York: Verso, 1998)
 Balibar, Étienne: Spinoza. Il transindividuale, a cura di Laura Di Martino e Luca Pinzolo. (Milano: Ghibli, 2002) [in Italian]
 Balibar, Étienne: Spinoza ve Siyaset, çev. Sanem Soyarslan. (İstanbul: Otonom Yayıncılık, 2004) [in Turkish]
 Balibar, Étienne: Spinoza: De la individualidad a la transindividualidad. Traducción de Anselmo Torres. (Córdoba, Argentina: Editorial Encuentro, 2009) [in Spanish]
 Balibar, Étienne: Spinoza i polityka [Tłum. Andrzej Staroń]. (Warszawa: Wydawnictwo Naukowe PWN, 2009) [in Polish]
 Balibar, Étienne: Spinoza y la política. Traducción de César Marchesino y Gabriel Merlino. (Buenos Aires: Prometeo Libros, 2011) [in Spanish]
 Balibar, Étienne: Spinoza politique. Le transindividuel. (Paris: PUF, 2018) [in French]
 Baltas, Aristides: Peeling Potatoes or Grinding Lenses: Spinoza and Young Wittgenstein Converse on Immanence and Its Logic. (Pittsburgh, PA: Pittsburgh University Press, 2012)
 Baltzer, August: Spinozas Entwicklungsgang, besonders nach seinen Briefen geschildert. (Kiel: Lipsius & Tischer, 1888) [in German]
 Balzano, Angela: Soggettività autonome. Corpi e potenza da Spinoza al neofemminismo. (Saarbruecken: Edizioni Accademiche Italiane, 2014) [in Italian]
 Barbaras, Françoise: Spinoza: La science mathématique du salut. (Paris: CNRS Éditions, 2007) [in French]
 Bartuschat, Wolfgang: Spinozas Theorie des Menschen. (Hamburg: Felix Meiner Verlag, 1992) [in German]
 Bartuschat, Wolfgang: Spinozas Philosophie: Über den Zusammenhang von Metaphysik und Ethik. (Hamburg: Felix Meiner Verlag, 2017) [in German]
 Bastiani, Marta Libertà de: Spinoza e gli storici latini. L'uso di storie, citazioni edesempi nella filosofia politica spinoziana. (Ph.D. diss, École normale supérieure de Lyon; Università degli Studi Roma Tre, 2019) [in Italian]
 Battisti, Giuseppa Saccaro (ed.): Il pensiero di Baruch Spinoza. A cura di Giuseppa Saccaro Battisti. (Torino: Loescher Editore, 1981) [in Italian]
 Becher, Erich: Der Begriff des Attributes bei Spinoza, in seiner Entwicklung und seinen Beziehungen zu den Begriffen der Substanz und des Modus. (Halle a.d.S.: M. Niemeyer, 1905) [in German]
 Beeckman, Tinneke: Door Spinoza's lens: Macht, meditatie, manifestatie, evolutie, seksualiteit. (Kalmthout: Pelckmans/Klement, 2012) [in Dutch]
 Beeckman, Tinneke: Door Spinoza's lens: Een oefening in levensfilosofie. (Antwerpen: Uitgeverij Polis, 2016) [in Dutch]
 Belaief, Gail: Spinoza's Philosophy of Law. (The Hague: Mouton, 1971)
 Belcheff, David: Spinoza on the Spirit of Friendship. (M.A. thesis, Arizona State University, 2014)
 Bellissen, Héloïse Guay de: Spinoza antistress en 99 pilules philosophiques. (Paris: Éditions de l'Opportun, 2015) [in French]
 Beltrán, Miquel: Un espejo extraviado. Spinoza y la filosofía hispano-judía. (Barcelona: Riopiedras, 1998) [in Spanish]
 Beltrán, Miquel: The Influence of Abraham Cohen de Herrera's Kabbalah on Spinoza's Metaphysics. (Leiden: Brill, 2016)
 Benincà, A.: La libertà umana nell'Etica di B. Spinoza. (Caravate: Gabriel, 1952) [in Italian]
 Benito Olalla, María Pilar: Baruch Spinoza: Una nueva ética para la liberación humana. (Madrid: Biblioteca Nueva, 2015) [in Spanish]
 Bennett, Jonathan: A Study of Spinoza's Ethics. (Cambridge: Cambridge University Press, 1984)
 Bennett, Jonathan: Un estudio de la ética de Spinoza. Traducción de José Antonio Robles García. (Ciudad de México: Fondo de Cultura Económica, 1990) [in Spanish]
 Berger, Herman: De Ethica van Spinoza. Een handreiking. (Antwerpen/Apeldoorn: Garant, 2011) [in Dutch]
 Berti, Silvia (ed.): Trattato dei tre impostori. La vita e lo spirito del signor Benedetto de Spinoza. (Torino: Einaudi Editore, 1994) [in Italian]
 Bertrand, Michèle: Spinoza et l'imaginaire. (Paris: PUF, 1983) [in French]
 Bettini, Amalia: Il Cristo di Spinoza. (Milano: Ghibli, 2005) [in Italian]
 Biasutti, Franco: La dottrina della scienza in Spinoza. (Bologna: Pàtron Editore, 1979) [in Italian]
 Biddle, Stephen Anthony: Spinoza's Moral Philosophy. (Ph.D. diss., Bryn Mawr College, 1980)
 Bidney, David: The Psychology and Ethics of Spinoza: A Study in the History and Logic of Ideas. (New Haven, CT: Yale University Press, 1940)
 Biedermann, Otto Heinrich: Die Methode der Auslegung und Kritik der biblischen Schriften in Spinozas Theologisch-politischem Traktat im Zusammenhang mit seiner Ethik. (Erlangen: Buchdruckerei von E.T. Jacob, 1903) [in German]
 Billecoq, Alain: Spinoza et les spectres. Un essai sur l'esprit philosophique. (Paris: Presses Universitaires de France, 1987) [in French]
 Billecoq, Alain: Les combats de Spinoza. (Paris: Ellipses, 1997) [in French]
 Billecoq, Alain: Spinoza: Questions politiques. Quatre études sur l'actualité du Traité politique. (Paris: L'Harmattan, 2009) [in French]
 Billecoq, Alain: Spinoza ou L'«athée vertueux». (Montreuil: Le Temps des Cerises, 2016) [in French]
 Billecoq, Alain: Spinoza, la politique et la liberté. (Paris: Editions Demopolis, 2018) [in French]
 Biondi, Zachary: Spinoza's Eternal Mind. (MA thesis, University of Arkansas, Fayetteville, 2015)
 Blackwell, Kenneth: The Spinozistic Ethics of Bertrand Russell. (London: George Allen & Unwin, 1985)
 Blanckaert, Camille: Spinoza on Human Nature: An Inquiry to Spinoza's Conception of the Essence of Man. (MA thesis, Ghent University, 2016)
 Boehm, Omri: Kant's Critique of Spinoza. (Oxford: Oxford University Press, 2014) 
 Bohrmann, Georg: Spinozas Stellung zur Religion. Eine Untersuchung auf der Grundlage des theologisch-politischen Traktats; nebst einem Anhang: Spinoza in England (1670–1750). (Giessen: Alfred Töpelmann, 1914) [in German]
 Bonicalzi, Francesca: L'impensato della politica. Spinoza e il vincolo civile. (Napoli: Guida Editori, 1999) [in Italian]
 Boss, Gilbert: L'enseignement de Spinoza – Commentaire du "Court Traité". (Zurich: Éditions du Grand Midi, 1982) [in French]
 Bordoli, Roberto: Vitae meditatio. Gramsci e Spinoza a confronto. (Urbino: Quattroventi, 1990) [in Italian]
 Bordoli, Roberto: Baruch Spinoza, etica e ontologia. Note sulle nozioni di sostanza, di essenza e di esistenza nell'Ethica. (Milano: Edizioni Angelo Guerini, 1996) [in Italian]
 Bordoli, Roberto: Dio ragione verità. (Macerata: Quodlibet, 2009) [in Italian]
 Boscherini, Emilia Giancotti: Lexicon Spinozanum [2 vols.]. (The Hague: Martinus Nijhoff, 1970)
 Boscherini, Emilia Giancotti: Studi su Hobbes e Spinoza. (Napoli: Bibliopolis, 1995) [in Italian]
 Bostrenghi, Daniela: Forme e virtù dell'immaginazione in Spinoza. (Napoli: Bibliopolis, 1996) [in Italian]
 Bove, Laurent: La strategia del conatus. Affermazione e resistenza in Spinoza. Traduzione italiana di Filippo Del Lucchese. (Milano: Edizioni Ghibli, 2002) [in Italian]
 Bove, Laurent: La estrategia del conatus. Afirmación y resistencia en Spinoza. Traducción de Gemma Sanz Espinar. (Madrid: Tierradenadie Ediciones, 2009) [in Spanish] 
 Bove, Laurent: Vauvenargues ou le séditieux. Entre Pascal et Spinoza. Une philosophie pour la seconde nature. (Paris: Éditions Honoré Champion, 2010) [in French]
 Brandau, John A.: Spinoza on Definition and Essence. (PhD diss., Johns Hopkins University, 2016)
 Braun, Roland: Metaphysik und Methode bei Spinoza. Eine problemorientierte Darstellung der "Ethica ordine geometrico demonstrata". (Würzburg: Königshausen & Neumann, 2017) [in German]
 Braz, Adelino: Apprendre à philosopher avec Spinoza. (Paris: Ellipses, 2012) [in French]
 Brenner-Golomb, Nancy: The Importance of Spinoza for the Modern Philosophy of Science: Can the Revival of Spinoza's Naturalism Refute Cultural Relativism?. (New Brunswick, NJ: Ontos Verlag, 2010)
 Breton, Stanislas: Politique, religion, écriture chez Spinoza. (Lyon: Profac, 1973) [in French]
 Brissoni, Armando: Due cunicoli di Spinoza. L'infinito e il more geometrico. (Bivongi: International AM Edizioni, 2008) [in Italian]
 Brissoni, Armando: Lemmi spinoziani. (Bivongi: International AM Edizioni, 2014) [in Italian]
 Brochard, Victor: Études de philosophie ancienne et moderne. Le Dieu de Spinoza, suivi de L'Eternité des âmes dans la philosophie de Spinoza. (Paris: Ed.Manucius, 2013) [in French]
 Brøchner, Hans: Benedict Spinoza. En monographie. (København: P.G. Philipsens Forlag, 1857) [in Danish]
 Brouwer, Rinse Reeling: De god van Spinoza. Een theologische studie. (Kampen: Kok, 1998) [in Dutch]
 Brunner, Constantin: Spinoza gegen Kant und die Sache der geistigen Wahrheit. (Berlin: Karl Schnabel Verlag, 1910) [in German]
 Brunner, Constantin: Spinoza contre Kant et la cause de la vérité spirituelle. Traduit et précédé d'un avant propos par Henri Lurié. (Paris: J. Vrin, 1932) [in French]
 Brunschvicg, Léon: Spinoza et ses contemporains. (Paris: Félix Alcan, 1923) [in French]
 Brykman, Geneviève: La Judéité de Spinoza. (Paris: J. Vrin, 1972) [in French]
 Bumin, Tülin: Tartışılan Modernlik: Descartes ve Spinoza. (İstanbul: Yapı Kredi Yayınları, 1996) [in Turkish]
 Bunker, Jenny: Schopenhauer's Spinozism. (PhD diss., University of Southampton, 2015)
 Busolt, Georg: Die Grundzüge der Erkenntnisztheorie und Metaphysik Spinozas. (Berlin: E. S. Mittler und Sohn, 1875) [in German]
 Busse, Julien: Le problème de l'essence de l'homme chez Spinoza. (Paris: Publications de la Sorbonne, 2009) [in French]
 Busse, Ludwig: Beiträge zur Entwicklungsgeschichte Spinoza's. (Berlin: Universitäts-Buchdruckerei von Gustav Schade, 1885) [in German]
 Baumgardt, David: Spinoza und Mendelssohn: Reden und Aufsätze zu ihren Gedenktagen. (Berlin: Philo-Verlag, 1932) [in German]
 Bouchilloux, Hélène: Spinoza Les deux voies du salut. (Paris: L'Harmattan, 2018) [in French]
 Buddeus, Johann Franz: Dissertatio philosophica de Spinozismo ante Spinozam. (Halle: Henckel, 1701) [in Latin]
 Bwele, Guillaume: Les multiples visages de Spinoza. Des limites de la totalité. (Paris: Les Editions ABC, 1984) [in French]
 Cavallera, Hervé A.: Del retto agire. Spinoza e l'educazione. (Torino: Il Segnalibro, 1996) [in Italian]
 Cavallera, Hervé A.: Spinoza. La saggezza dell'Occidente. (Lecce: Pensa MultiMedia, 2014) [in Italian]
 Calvetti, Carla Gallicet: Spinoza, i presupposti teoretici dell'irenismo etico. (Milano: Società Editrice Vita e Pensiero, 1968) [in Italian]
 Camerer, Theodor: Die lehre Spinozas. (Stuttgart: Cotta, 1877) [in German]
 Camerer, Theodor: Spinoza und Schleiermacher: Die kritische Lösung des von Spinoza hinterlassenen Problems. (Stuttgart/Berlin: J.G. Cotta, 1903) [in German]
 Campanale, A.M.: Diritto e politica tra necessità e libertà nel pensiero di Spinoza. (Pisa: Edizioni ETS, 1993) [in Italian]
 Campos, André Santos: Spinoza's Revolutions in Natural Law. (New York: Palgrave Macmillan, 2012)
 Campos, André Santos: Spinoza and Law. (London: Ashgate, 2015)
 Canaslan, Eylem: Spinoza: Yöntem-Tanrı-Demokrasi. (Ankara: Dost Kitabevi Yayınları, 2019) [in Turkish]
 Caporali, Riccardo: La fabbrica dell'imperium. Saggio su Spinoza. (Napoli: Liguori, 2000) [in Italian]
 Caporali, Riccardo: La pazienza degli esclusi. Studi su Spinoza. (Milano: Mimesis, 2012) [in Italian]
 Caraballo, Germán Ulises Bula: Spinoza, educación para el cambio. (Bogotá: Editorial Aula de Humanidades, 2017) [in Spanish]
 Cariolato, Alfonso; Nancy, Jean-Luc: "Le Geste de Dieu": Sur un lieu de l'Ethique de Spinoza. (Chatou: Editions de la Transparence, 2011) [in French]
 Carp, J.H.: Het Spinozisme als wereldbeschouwing: Inleiding tot de leer van Benedictus de Spinoza. (Arnhem: Van Loghum Slaterus, 1931) [in Dutch]
 Carrasquer, Francisco: Servet, Spinoza y Sender. Miradas de eternidad. Prólogo de Angel Alcalá. (Zaragoza: Prensas Universitarias de Zaragoza, 2007) [in Spanish]
 Cascione, Giuseppe: Libertà e paura. Echi e discrimina hobbesiani nel pensiero di Spinoza. (Milano: Edizioni Ennerre, 1999) [in Italian]
 Cassuto, Philippe: Spinoza et les commentateurs juifs. (Aix-en-Provence: Publications de l'École nationale des chartes, 1998) [in French]
 Cassuto, Philippe: Spinoza hébraïsant. (Leuven: Peters, 1999) [in French]
 Cauchepin, Philippe: Le salut ou l'évangile selon Spinoza. (Paris: L'Harmattan, 2016) [in French]
 Ceccarelli, Alessandro: Contributi sulla teoria delle nozioni comuni in Spinoza. (Dottorato di ricerca in filosofia, Università degli Studi di Bologna, 2007) [in Italian]
 Cecchi, Delfo: Estetica e eterodossia in Spinoza. (Pisa: Edizioni ETS, 2005) [in Italian]
 Cellura, Gaetano: La bottega di Spinoza. Racconti storici e civili. (Catania: Edizioni Prova d'Autore, 2013) [in Italian]
 Cerrato, Francesco: Cause e nozioni comuni nella filosofia di Spinoza. (Macerata: Quodlibet, 2009) [in Italian]
 Cerrato, Francesco: Un secolo di passioni e politica: Hobbes, Descartes, Spinoza. (Roma: DeriveApprodi, 2012) [in Italian]
 Cerrato, Francesco: Stili di vita: Fonti, forme e governo nella filosofia spinoziana degli affetti. (Milano–Udine: Mimesis Edizioni, 2016) [in Italian]
 Cerrato, Francesco: Liberare la modernità. Spinoza in Italia tra Risorgimento e Unità. (Soveria Mannelli: Rubbettino Editore, 2016) [in Italian]
 Chamla, Mino: Spinoza e il concetto della tradizione ebraica. (Milano: Franco Angeli, 1996) [in Italian]
 Chaui, Marilena: Spinoza e la politica. Traduzione e cura di Marco Vanzulli. (Milano: Ghibli, 2006) [in Italian]
 Cherniavsky, Axel: Spinoza: Estudio preliminar y selección de textos. (Ciudad Autónoma de Buenos Aires: Galerna, 2017) [in Spanish]
 Ciccarelli, Roberto: Potenza e beatitudine. Il diritto nel pensiero di Baruch Spinoza. (Roma: Carocci, 2003) [in Italian]
 Ciccarelli, Roberto: Immanenza e politica in Spinoza. (Roma: Aracne, 2006) [in Italian]
 Cimini, Amy: Baruch Spinoza and the Matter of Music: Toward a New Practice of Theorizing Musical Bodies. (Ph.D. diss., New York University, 2011)
 Ciscato, Costanza: Spinoza e la stoà. Per una fondazione ontologica del diritto naturale. (Padova: CEDAM, 2006) [in Italian]
 Clarke, Tim: The Spinozan Strain: Monistic Modernism and the Challenge of Immanence. (PhD thesis, University of Ottawa, 2018)
 Coers, Kathy F.: Understanding and the Moral: A Contemporary Adaptation of the 'Ethics' of Spinoza. (Ph.D. diss., Emory University, 1988)
 Cohen, Richard A.: Out of Control: Confrontations Between Spinoza and Levinas. (Albany: State University of New York Press, 2016)
 Colitti, Marcello: Etica e politica di Baruch Spinoza. (Reggio Emilia: Aliberti Editore, 2010) [in Italian]
 Collegia, Jean-Pascal: Spinoza, la matrice. Nouveaux éclairages sur le bonheur, la liberté, la hiérarchie, l'éternité, la mort, la morale, Dieu, le chaos, l'inconscient, le sexe, l'humanisme, l'école. (Paris: L'Harmattan, 2012) [in French]
 Collin, Denis: Libre comme Spinoza. Une introduction à la lecture de L'Ethique. (Paris: Max Milo Éditions, 2014)
 Collins, James: Spinoza on Nature. (Carbondale and Edwardsville: Southern Illinois University Press, 1984)
 Conche, Marcel: Penser encore. Sur Spinoza et autres sujets. (Paris: Encre Marine, 2016) [in French]
 Connelly, Stephen: Spinoza, Right and Absolute Freedom. (New York, NY: Birkbeck Law Press, 2015)
 Corsello, Sabrina: La politica tra natura e artificio. L'antropologia positiva di Benedetto Spinoza. (Palermo: ILA Palma, 1994) [in Italian]
 Corsi, Mario: Politica e saggezza in Spinoza. (Napoli: Guida Editori, 1978) [in Italian]
 Cortés Cuadra, Juan Vicente: Jouissance et liberté chez Spinoza. (Thèse de doctorat en philosophie, Université Paris 1 Panthéon-Sorbonne, 2014) [in French]
 Cortés Cuadra, Juan Vicente: La notion de jouissance chez Spinoza. Essai de reconstruction conceptuelle [col. «La philosophie à l'œuvre»]. (Paris: Éditions de la Sorbonne, 2019) [in French]
 Cramer, Wolfgang: Die absolute Reflexion, Band 1: Spinozas Philosophie des Absoluten. (Frankfurt am Main: Klostermann, 1966) [in German]
 Cremaschi, Sergio: L'automa spirituale. La teoria della mente e delle passioni in Spinoza. (Milano: Universita Cattolica del Sacre Cuore, 1979) [in Italian]
 Crippa, Romeo: Studi sulla coscienza etica e religiosa del Seicento: le passioni in Spinoza. (Milano: Marzorati, 1965) [in Italian]
 Cristofolini, Paolo: Spinoza per tutti. (Milano: Feltrinelli, 1993) [in Italian]
 Cristofolini, Paolo: Spinoza: Chemins dans l'Éthique. (Paris: Presses universitaires de France – PUF, 1996) [in French]
 Cristofolini, Paolo: Spinoza edonista. (Pisa: Edizioni ETS, 2002) [in Italian]
 Cristofolini, Paolo: L'uomo libero. L'eresia spinozista alle radici dell'Europa moderna. (Pisa: ETS, 2007) [in Italian]
 Cristofolini, Paolo: La scienza intuitiva di Spinoza. (Pisa: Edizioni ETS, 2009) [in Italian]
 Crowther, Louise: Diderot and Lessing as Exemplars of a Post-Spinozist Mentality. (London: MHRA & Maney Publishing, 2010)
 D'Anna, Giuseppe: Uno intuitu videre. Sull'ultimo genere di conoscenza in Spinoza. (Milano: Mimesis, 2002) [in Italian]
 Dahlbeck, Johan: Spinoza and Education: Freedom, Understanding and Empowerment. (London: Routledge, 2016) 
 Dahlbeck, Johan: Education and Free Will: Spinoza, Causal Determinism and Moral Formation. (London: Routledge, 2018)
 Dahlbeck, Moa De Lucia: Spinoza, Ecology and International Law: Radical Naturalism in the Face of the Anthropocene. (London/New York: Routledge, 2018)
 Damásio, António: Looking for Spinoza: Joy, Sorrow, and the Feeling Brain. (Orlando, FL: Harcourt, 2003)
 Damásio, António: Spinoza avait raison. Joie et tristesse, le cerveau des émotions. (Paris: Éditions Odile Jacob, 2003) [in French]
 Damásio, António: Alla ricerca di Spinoza. Emozioni, sentimenti e cervello. Traduzione di Isabella Blum. (Milano: Adelphi, 2003) [in Italian]
 Damásio, António: Der Spinoza-Effekt. Wie Gefühle unser Leben bestimmen. (München: List Verlag, 2003) [in German]
 Damásio, António: En busca de Spinoza. Neurobiología de la emoción y los sentimientos. Traducción castellana de Joandomènec Ros. (Barcelona: Editorial Crítica, 2005) [in Spanish]
 Damásio, António: Het gelijk van Spinoza: Vreugde, verdriet en het voelende brein [Vert. Marjolijn Soltenkamp]. (Amsterdam: Wereldbibliotheek, 2010) [in Dutch]
 Damásio, António: Spinoza'yı Ararken: Haz, Aci ve Hisseden Beyin, çev. Emre Kumral ve İlay Çetiner. (Ankara: Odtü Yayıncılık, 2018) [in Turkish]
 Danino, Philippe: Le meilleur ou le vrai. Spinoza et l'idée de philosophie. (Paris: Publications de la Sorbonne [La philosophie à l'œuvre], 2014) [in French]
 Danzel, Theodor Wilhelm: Über Goethes Spinozismus. Ein Beitrag zur tieferen Würdigung des Dichters und Forschers. (Hamburg: Johann August Meißner, 1843) [in German]
 Darbon, André: Études spinozistes. (Paris: P.U.F., 1946) [in French]
 Daumal, René: Spinoza o la dinamite filosofica. Traduzione di Ottavia Modesti. (Roma: Castelvecchi, 2014) [in Italian]
 Demurtas, Marco: Illuminismo radicale. La filosofia di Spinoza alle origini della democrazia moderna. (Roma: Carocci, 2019) [in Italian]
 De Casseres, Benjamin: Spinoza against the Rabbis. (New York: B. De Casseres at the Blackstone Publishers, 1937)
 De Castres, Sabatier: Apologie de Spinoza et du spinozisme contre les athées, les incrédules et contre les théologiens scolastiques platoniciens. (Paris: Fournier, 1810) [in French]
 De Deugd, Cornelis: The Significance of Spinoza's First Kind of Knowledge. (Assen: Van Gorcum, 1966)
 De Dijn, Herman: Spinoza: The Way to Wisdom. (West Lafayette, IN: Purdue University Press, 1996)
 De Dijn, Herman: Spinoza: De doornen en de roos. (Kapellen: Pelckmans/Klement, 2009) [in Dutch]
 De Graaff, F.: Spinoza en de crisis van de Westerse cultuur. (Den Haag: J.N. Voorhoeve, 1977) [in Dutch]
 De Jonge, Eccy: Spinoza and Deep Ecology: Challenging Traditional Approaches to Environmentalism. (Aldershot, UK: Ashgate Publishing, 2004)
 Dejardin, Bertrand: Pouvoir et impuissance. Philosophie et politique chez Spinoza. (Paris: L'Harmattan, 2003) [in French]
 Dejardin, Bertrand: Éthique et esthétique chez Spinoza. Liberté philosophique et servitude culturelle. (Paris: L'Harmattan, 2012) [in French]
 Della Rocca, Michael: Representation and the Mind-body Problem in Spinoza. (Oxford: Oxford University Press, 1996)
 Den Uyl, Douglas: Power, State and Freedom: An Interpretation of Spinoza's Political Thought. (Assen: Van Gorcum, 1983)
 Den Uyl, Douglas: God, Man, and Well-Being: Spinoza's Modern Humanism. (New York: Peter Lang, 2008)
 Delassus, Éric: De l'Éthique de Spinoza à l'éthique médicale. (Rennes: Presses Universitaires de Rennes, 2011) [in French]
 Delassus, Éric: Penser avec Spinoza. Vaincre les préjugés: Analyse et commentaire de l'Appendice de la partie I de l'Ethique [coll. «La philothèque»]. (Paris: Bréal, 2014)  [in French]
 Delassus, Éric: Spinoza [coll. «Connaître en citations»]. (Paris: Ellipses, 2016) [in French]
 Delbos, Victor: Le spinozisme. Cours professé à la Sorbonne en 1912–1913. (Paris: Société Française d'Imprimerie et de Librairie, 1916) [in French]
 Delbos, Victor: Le spinozisme. (Paris: Vrin, 1950) [in French]
 Delbos, Victor: Le problème moral dans la philosophie de Spinoza et dans l'histoire du Spinozisme. (Paris: Félix Alean, 1893; Zurich: Hildesheim, 1988) [in French]
 Delbos, Victor: O problema moral na filosofia de Spinoza e na história do spinozismo [Tradução: Martha de Aratanha]. (Rio de Janeiro: Editora FGV, 2016) [in Portuguese]
 Deleuze, Gilles: Spinoza et le problème de l'expression. (Paris: Éditions de Minuit, 1968; Paris: Éditions de Minuit, 1985) [in French]
 Deleuze, Gilles: Spinoza. (Paris: PUF, 1970) [in French]
 Deleuze, Gilles: Espinoza e os signos. [Trad. Abílio Ferreira]. (Porto: Rés Editora, 1970) [in Portuguese]
 Deleuze, Gilles: Spinoza: Philosophie pratique. (Paris: Éditions de Minuit, 1981) [in French]
 Deleuze, Gilles: Spinoza: Filosofía práctica. Traducción de Antonio Escohotado. (Barcelona: Tusquets, 1984) [in Spanish]
 Deleuze, Gilles: Spinoza: Praktische Philosophie. Aus dem Französischen von Hedwig Linden. (Berlin: Merve Verlag, 1988) [in German]
 Deleuze, Gilles: Spinoza und das Problem des Ausdrucks in der Philosophie. Aus dem Französischen von Ulrich Johannes Schneide. (München: Wilhelm Fink Verlag, 1993) [in German]
 Deleuze, Gilles: Spinoza: Expressionism in Philosophy. Translated from the French by Martin Joughin. (New York: Zone Books, 1992)
 Deleuze, Gilles: Spinoza y el problema de la expresión. Traducción de Horst Vogel. (Barcelona: Muchnik Editores, 1996) [in Spanish]
 Deleuze, Gilles: Spinoza e il problema dell'espressione. Traduzione di Saverio Ansaldi. (Macerata: Quodlibet, 1999) [in Italian]
 Deleuze, Gilles: Spinoza Üstüne On Bir Ders, çev. Ulus Baker. (Ankara: Öteki Yayınevi, 2000) [in Turkish]
 Deleuze, Gilles: Spinoza: Practical Philosophy. Translated from the French by Robert Hurley. (San Francisco: City Lights Publishers, 2001)
 Deleuze, Gilles: Espinosa: filosofia prática. Tradução de Daniel Lins e Fabien Pascal Lins. (São Paulo: Escuta, 2002) [in Portuguese]
 Deleuze, Gilles: Spinoza: Pratik Felsefe, çev. Ulus Baker ve Alber Nahum. (İstanbul: Norgunk Yayıncılık, 2005) [in Turkish]
 Deleuze, Gilles: En medio de Spinoza [2da. edición]. Traducción de las memorables clases de Deleuze sobre Spinoza en la Universidad de Vincennes durante los años 1980 y 1981. (Buenos Aires: Editorial Cactus, 2006) [in Spanish]
 Deleuze, Gilles: Spinoza Üzerine Onbir Ders, çev. Ulus Baker. (İstanbul: Kabalcı Yayınevi, 2008) [in Turkish]
 Deleuze, Gilles: Cursos sobre Spinoza (Vincennes, 1978–1981). Tradução de Emanuel Angelo da Rocha Fragoso, Francisca Evilene Barbosa de Castro, Hélio Rebello Cardoso Júnior e Jeferson Alves de Aquino. (Fortaleza, Ceará: EdUECE – Editora da Universidade Estadual do Ceará, 2009) [in Portuguese]
 Deleuze, Gilles: Cosa può un corpo? Lezioni su Spinoza. Prefazione e cura di Aldo Pardi. (Verona: Ombre Corte, 2010) [in Italian]
 Deleuze, Gılles: Spinoza ve İfade Problemi, çev. Alber Nahum. (İstanbul: Norgunk Yayıncılık, 2013) [in Turkish]
 Deleuze, Gilles: Spinoza. Filozofia praktyczna [Tłum. Jędrzej Brzeziński]. (Warszawa: Wydawnictwo Naukowe PWN, 2014) [in Polish]
 Deleuze, Gilles: Spinoza: Filosofia pratica. A cura di Marco Senaldi. (Napoli: Orthotes Editrice, 2016) [in Italian]
 Delfino, Aurelia: Il Filosofo clandestino. La figura e il pensiero di Spinoza in Francia nei manoscritti proibiti del settecento. (Milano: Mimesis, 2010) [in Italian]
 Deveaux, Sherry: The Role of God in Spinoza's Metaphysics. (New York: Continuum, 2007)
 Diefenbach, Katja: Politik der Potentialität. Die Spinozarezeption im Postmarxismus. (Ph.D. diss., Humboldt-Universität zu Berlin, 2016) [in German]
 Diefenbach, Katja: Spekulativer Materialismus. Spinoza in der postmarxistischen Philosophie. (Wien: Verlag Turia + Kant, 2018) [in German]
 Diodato, Roberto: Sub specie aeternitatis. Luoghi dell'ontologia spinoziana. (Milano: Mimesis, 2011) [in Italian]
 Di Luca, Giovanni: Critica della religione in Spinoza. (L'Aquila: Japadre, 1982) [in Italian]
 Di Luca, Giovanni: La teologia razionale di Spinoza. (L'Aquila: Japadre, 1993) [in Italian]
 Di Vona, Piero: Studi sull'ontologia di Spinoza. Parte I. L'ordinamento delle scienze filosofiche – La "ratio" – Il concetto di ente. (Firenze: La Nuova Italia, 1960) [in Italian]
 Di Vona, Piero: Studi sull'ontologia di Spinoza. Parte II. "Res" ed "Ens" – La necessità – Le divisioni dell'essere. (Firenze: La Nuova Italia, 1969) [in Italian]
 Di Vona, Piero: Spinoza e i trascendentali. (Napoli: Morano, 1977) [in Italian]
 Di Vona, Piero: La conoscenza "sub specie aeternitatis" nell'opera di Spinoza. (Napoli: Loffredo Editore, 1995) [in Italian]
 Di Vona, Piero: Uno Spinoza diverso. L'Ethica di Spinoza e dei suoi amici. (Brescia: Morcelliana, 2011) [in Italian]
 Dienstfertig, Marcus: Die menschliche Freiheit nach Spinoza. (Breslau: F.W. Jungfer, 1872) [in German]
 Dobbs-Weinstein, Idit: Spinoza's Critique of Religion and Its Heirs: Marx, Benjamin, Adorno. (Cambridge: Cambridge University Press, 2015) 
 Doesschate, G. ten (ed.): Benedictus de Spinoza's Algebraic Calculation of the Rainbow. Facsimile of the original Dutch text with an introduction by G. ten Doesschate. (Nieuwkoop: B. de Graaf, 1963)
 Domínguez, Atilano: Spinoza: Vida, escritos y sistema de filosofía moral. (Madrid: Guillermo Escolar y Mayo Editores, 2019) [in Spanish]
 Donagan, Alan: Spinoza. (Chicago: University of Chicago Press, 1989)
 Donna, Diego: Norma, segno, autorità. Filosofia, teologia e politica in Spinoza. (Bologna: Bononia University Press, 2019) [in Italian]
 Duff, Robert A.: Spinoza's Political and Ethical Philosophy. (Glasgow: James Maclehose and Sons, 1903; New York: Augustus M. Kelley Publishers, 1970)
 Dunham, James Henry: Freedom and Purpose: An Interpretation of the Psychology of Spinoza. (Princeton, NJ: Princeton University Press, 1916)
 Dunin-Borkowski, Stanislaus von: Der junge de Spinoza: Leben und Werdegang im Lichte der Weltphilosophie. (Münster: Aschendorffs, 1910) [in German]
 Dunin-Borkowski, Stanislaus von: Spinoza nach dreihundert Jahren. (Berlin/Bonn: F. Dümmler, 1932) [in German]
 Dunin-Borkowski, Stanislaus von: Spinoza [4 vols.]. (Münster: Aschendorff, 1933–6) [in German]
 Dunkhase, Jan Eike: Spinoza der Hebräer. Zu einer israelischen Erinnerungsfigur. (Göttingen: Vandenhoeck & Ruprecht Verlag, 2013)  [in German]
 Durant, Will: A Guide to Spinoza [Little Blue Book, No. 520]. (Girard, KA: Haldeman-Julius Company, 1924)
 Eisenstein, Israel: Ein neuer Beitrag zum Verständnis Spinozas aufgrund der Lehre Constantin Brunners. (Frankfurt am Main: Athenäum, 1989) [in German]
 Elbogen, Ismar: Der Tractatus de Intellectus Emendatione und seine Stellung in der Philosophie Spinozas. Ein Beitrag zur Entwickelungsgeschichte Spinozas. (Breslau: Preuss & Junger, 1898) [in German]
 Elliott, Michelle Adrienne: Spinoza's Metaphysics and its Place in Early Modern Philosophy. (Ph.D. diss., University of Minnesota, 2003)
 Ellsiepen, Christof: Anschauung des Universums und Scientia Intuitiva. Die spinozistischen Grundlagen von Schleiermachers früher Religionstheorie. (Berlin: De Gruyter, 2006) [in German]
 Elmas, Mehmet Fatih: Spinoza ve İnsan. (İstanbul: Sentez Yayıncılık, 2015) [in Turkish]
 Erhardt, Franz: Die Philosophie des Spinoza im Lichte der Kritik. (Leipzig: O.R. Reisland, 1908) [in German]
 Erhardt, Franz: Die Weltanschauung Spinozas. (Stuttgart: Strecker & Schröder, 1928) [in German]
 Espinosa Rubio, L.: Spinoza: Naturaleza y ecosistema. (Salamanca: Publicaciones Universidad Pontificia de Salamanca, 1995) [in Spanish]
 Espinoza, Enrique: Spinoza, águila y paloma. (Buenos Aires: Babel, 1978) [in Spanish]
 Evangelista, Roberto: Il bagaglio politico degli individui. La dinamica consuetudinaria nella riflessione di Spinoza. (Milano: Mimesis, 2010) [in Italian]
 Ezcurdia, José: Spinoza ¿místico o ateo? Inmanencia y amor en la naciente Edad Moderna. (Guanajuato: Instituto de Investigaciones en Educación, Universidad de Guanajuato, 2005) [in Spanish]
 Ezquerra Gómez, Jesús: Un claro laberinto. Lectura de Spinoza. (Zaragoza: Prensas de la Universidad de Zaragoza, 2014) [in Spanish]
 Farotti, Fabio: L'eternità mancata Spinoza. (Milano: Mimesis, 2018) [in Italian]
 Felice, Federica de: Wolff e Spinoza. Ricostruzione storico-critica dell'interpretazione wolffiana della filosofia di Spinoza. (Roma: Aracne, 2008) [in Italian]
 Fels, Wilhelm: Spinoza, der große Philosoph, als er römisch-katholisch werden sollte. (Leipzig: Johann Friedrich Glück, 1829) [in German]
 Feuer, Lewis S.: Spinoza and the Rise of Liberalism. (Boston: Beacon Press, 1958)
 Fox, A. C.: Faith and Philosophy: Spinoza on Religion. Edited with an introduction by A. J. Watt. (Nedlands, Australia: University of Western Australia Press, 1990)
 Fraisse, Jean-Claude: L'oeuvre de Spinoza. (Paris: Vrin, 1978) [in French]
 Frampton, Travis L.: Spinoza and the Rise of Historical Criticism of the Bible. (London: Continuum International Publishing, 2006)
 Francès, Madeleine: Spinoza dans les pays néerlandais de la second moitié du XVIIe siècle. Première partie. (Paris: Félix Alcan, 1937) [in French]
 Fransez, Moris: Spinoza'nın Tao'su: Akıllı İnançtan İnançlı Akla. (İstanbul: Yol Yayınları, 2004) [in Turkish]
 Friedländer, Julius; Berendt, Martin: Spinoza's Erkenntnisslehre in ihrer Beziehung zur modernen Naturwissenschaft und Philosophie. (Berlin: Mayer & Müller, 1891) [in German]
 Friedländer, Julius: Spinoza, ein Meister der Ethik: Nach einem Vortrage gehalten in der Deutschen Gesellschaft für ethische Kultur in Berlin. (Berlin: C.R. Dreher, 1895) [in German]
 Friedrichs, Max: Der Substanzbegriff Spinozas neu und gegen die herrschenden Ansichten zu Gunsten des Philosophen erläutert. (Greifswald: Druck von Julius Abel, 1896) [in German]
 Frigo, Gianfranco: Matematismo e spinozismo nel primo Schelling. (Padova: CEDAM, 1969) [in Italian]
 Fukuoka, Atsuko: The Sovereign and the Prophets Spinoza on Grotian and Hobbesian Biblical Argumentation [Brill's Studies in Intellectual History, 268]. (Leiden/Boston: Brill, 2018)
 Fullerton, George Stuart: On Spinozistic Immortality. (Philadelphia: University of Pennsylvania, 1899)
 Gadd, Christopher D.: The Pre-Eminence of Spinoza's Third Kind of Knowledge. (Ph.D. diss., Queen's University at Kingston, 1975)
 Galvan, Alessandro: Leggere l'Etica di Spinoza. (Como-Pavia: Ibis, 2007) [in Italian]
 Gans, Maximilian Ernst: Spinozismus: Ein Beitrag zur Psychologie und Kulturgeschichte der Philosophierens. (Wien: J. Lenobel, 1907) [in German]
 García del Campo, Juan Pedro: Spinoza o la libertad. (Barcelona: Editorial Montesinos, 2008)  [in Spanish]
 García del Campo, Juan Pedro: Spinoza esencial: Nadie, hasta ahora, ha determinado lo que puede un cuerpo. (Barcelona: Editorial Montesinos, 2012) [in Spanish]
 Garelick, Herbert M.: Spinoza's Absolute Presupposition. (PhD diss., Yale University, 1958)
 Garrett, Aaron V.: Meaning in Spinoza's Method. (New York: Cambridge University Press, 2003)
 Garrett, Don: Necessity and Nature in Spinoza's Philosophy. (New York: Oxford University Press, 2018)
 Garulli, Enrico: Saggi su Spinoza. Con traduzione dei Cogitata Metaphysica. (Urbino: S.T.E.U., 1958) [in Italian]
 Garoz Bejarano, Emilio: El Dios incrédulo. Fundamentación del ateísmo en el pensamiento de Baruch de Spinoza. (Barcelona: Editorial Lampedusa, 2010)  [in Spanish]
 Garver, Eugene: Spinoza and the Cunning of Imagination. (Chicago: University of Chicago Press, 2018)
 Gaspari, Ilaria: Imaginandi potentia. Mente e corpo nella gnoseologia di Spinoza. (Ph.D. diss., Università di Pisa, 2010) [in Italian]
 Gattung, Christiane: Der Mensch als Glied der Unendlichkeit. Zur Anthropologie von Spinoza Epistemata Philosophie. (Würzburg: Königshausen & Neumann, 1993) [in German]
 Gebhardt, Carl: Spinoza: vier Reden. (Heidelberg: C. Winter, 1927) [in German]
 Gebhardt, Carl: Spinoza. (Leipzig: P. Reclam, 1932) [in German]
 Gebhardt, Carl: Spinoza, judaïsme et baroque. Textes réunis et présentés par Saverio Ansaldi. Traduits de l'allemand par Sylvie Riboud-Sainclair. La traduction a été revue et corrigée par Saverio Ansaldi, Anne Lagny, Béatrice Lenoir et Pierre-François Moreau [Travaux et documents du Groupe de Recherches Spinozistes, Nº9]. (Paris: Presses de l'Université Paris-Sorbonne, 2000) [in French]
 Gendron, Denise: L'éducation à la compréhension du désir en soi selon Spinoza. (Ph.D. diss., Université Laval, 2016) [in French]
 Giancotti, Emilia: Studi su Hobbes e Spinoza. A cura di Daniela Bostrenghi e Cristina Santinelli. (Napoli: Bibliopolis, 1995) [in Italian]
 Gilead, Amihud: A Rose Armed with Thorns: Spinoza's Philosophy Under a Novel Lens. (New York: Springer, 2020)
 Ginsberg, Hugo Wilhelm: Über den Einfluss der Psychologie des Spinoza auf seine Ethik. (Breslau: H. Lindner, 1855) [in German]
 Ginsberg, Hugo Wilhelm: Lebens- und Characterbild Baruch Spinoza's. (Leipzig: Erich Koschny, 1876) [in German]
 Ginzburg, Benjamin: The Doctrine of Essence in the Philosophy of Spinoza. (Ph.D. diss., Harvard University, 1926)
 Giorgi Fonseca, Luz Helena Di: Los afectos, las ideas y la formación de sujeto en Spinoza. (MA thesis, Universidad del Rosario, Bogotá, 2013) [in Spanish]
 Giovanni, Biagio de: Hegel e Spinoza. Dialogo sul moderno. (Napoli: Guida, 2011) [in Italian]
 Giovannoni, Augustin: Immanence et finitude chez Spinoza. Études sur l'idée de constitution dans l'«Éthique». (Paris: Éditions Kimé, 1999) [in French]
 Giuliani, Bruno: Le bonheur avec Spinoza. L'Éthique reformulée pour notre temps. (Paris: Almora, 2011) [in French]
 Giulietti, Giovanni: Spinoza. La sua vita, il suo pensiero. (Treviso: Editrice Canova, 1974) [in Italian]
 Glass, Peter Ronald: Spinoza on Knowledge, Freedom, and Education. (Ph.D. diss., University of London, Institute of Education, 1993)
 Gleizer, Marcos: Vérité et certitude chez Spinoza. (Paris: Classiques Garnier, 2017) [in French]
 Goetschel, Willi: Spinoza's Modernity: Mendelssohn, Lessing, and Heine. (Madison: University of Wisconsin Press, 2004) 
 Goodheir, Albert: Fondita sur roko: La filozofio de Spinoza post tri jarcentoj. (Glasgow: Eldonejo Kardo, 1977) [in Esperanto]
 Goodheir, Albert: Founded on a Rock: The Philosophy of Spinoza after Three Centuries. (Glasgow: Kardo, 1978)
 Grassi, Paola: L'interpretazione dell'immaginario. Uno studio in Spinoza. (Pisa: ETS, 2002) [in Italian]
 Grecchi, Luca: L'umanesimo greco classico di Spinoza. (Bologna: Diogene Multimedia, 2019) [in Italian]
 Grossman, Neal: The Spirit of Spinoza: Healing the Mind. (Princeton, NJ: ICRL Press, 2003)
 Grunwald, Max: Spinoza in Deutschland. Gekrönte Preisschrift. (Berlin: Verlag von S. Calvary & Co., 1897) [in German]
 Grzymisch, Siegfried: Spinoza's Lehren von der Ewigkeit und Unsterblichkeit. (Breslau: Druck von T. Schatzky, 1898) [in German]
 Gueroult, Martial: Spinoza: Dieu [Éthique, Vol. 1]. (Paris: Aubier-Montaigne, 1968) [in French]
 Gueroult, Martial: Spinoza: L'Âme [Éthique, Vol. 2]. (Paris: Aubier-Montaigne, 1974) [in French]
 Guiladi, Yael: El amor de Spinoza. (Barcelona: Edhasa, 2007) [in Spanish]
 Guilherme, Alexandre: Fichte and Schelling: The Spinoza Connection. (PhD diss., Durham University, 2007)
 Gullan-Whur, Margaret: A Perspective On The Mind-Body Problem, With Particular Reference To The Philosophy Of Spinoza. (Ph.D. diss., University College London, 1996)
 Gunn, J. Alexander: Benedict Spinoza. (Melbourne: Melbourne University Publishing; London: Macmillan & Co., 1925)
 Gunning, Johannes H.: Spinoza en de idee der persoonlijkheid. Eene studie. (Utrecht: Kemink & Zoon, 1876) [in Dutch]
 Gunning, Johannes H.: De eenheid des levens, naar Spinoza's Amor intellectualis. (Nijmegen: H. ten Hoet, 1903) [in Dutch]
 Gut, Przemysław: Spinoza o naturze ludzkiej. (Lublin: Wydawnictwo KUL, 2011) [in Polish]
 Guzzo, Augusto: Il pensiero di Spinoza. (Firenze: La Nuova Italia, 1994) [in Italian]
 Haddad-Chamakh, Fatma: Philosophie systématique et système de philosophie politique chez Spinoza. (Tunis: Publications de l'Université de Tunis, 1980) [in French]
 Hagemeier, Martin: Zur Vorstellungskraft in der Philosophie Spinozas [Schriftenreihe der Spinoza-Gesellschaft; Band 16]. (Würzburg: Königshausen & Neumann, 2012) [in German]
 Halévy, Marc: Citations de Spinoza expliquées: 100 citations expliquées et organisées par thèmes pour découvrir l'oeuvre et la pensée de Baruch Spinoza. (Paris: Eyrolles, 2015) [in French]
 Hallett, H. F.: Aeternitas: A Spinozistic Study. (Oxford: Clarendon, 1930)
 Hallett, H. F.: Creation, Emanation and Salvation: A Spinozistic Study. (The Hague: Martinus Nijhoff, 1962)
 Hallett, H. F.: Benedict de Spinoza: The Elements of His Philosophy. (London: Bloomsbury Academic, 2013)
 Hammacher, Klaus: Spinoza und die Frage nach der Unsterblichkeit. (Leiden: E.J. Brill, 1981) [in German]
 Handwerker Küchenhoff, Barbara: Spinozas Theorie der Affekte: Kohärenz und Konflikt. (Würzburg: Königshausen & Neumann, 2006) [in German]
 Hanus, Gilles: Sans images ni paroles. Spinoza face à la révélation. (Lagrasse: Édition Verdier, 2018) [in French]
 Harris, Errol E.: Salvation from Despair: A Reappraisal of Spinoza's Philosophy. (The Hague: Martinus Nijhoff, 1973)
 Harris, Errol E.: Spinoza's Philosophy: An Outline. (Atlantic Highlands, NJ: Humanities Press International, 1992)
 Harris, Errol E.: The Substance of Spinoza. (Atlantic Highlands, NJ: The Humanities Press, 1995)
 Hart, Alan: Spinoza's Ethics, Part I and II: A Platonic Commentary. (Leiden: E.J. Brill, 1983)
 Hebler, Carl: Spinoza's Lehre vom Verhältniss der Substanz zu ihren Bestimmtheiten. (Bern: Jenni, 1850) [in German]
 Henrard, Roger: De Spinozistische achtergrond van de Beweging van Tachtig. (Leiden: E.J. Brill, 1974) [in Dutch]
 Henrard, Roger: Wijsheidsgestalten in dichterwoord. Onderzoek naar de invloed van Spinoza op de Nederlandse literatuur. (Assen: Van Gorcum, 1977) [in Dutch]
 Henry, Michel: Le bonheur de Spinoza, suivi de: Étude sur le spinozisme de Michel Henry, par Jean-Michel Longneaux. (Paris: PUF, 2004) [in French]
 Henry, Julie: Spinoza, une anthropologie éthique. Variations affectives et historicité de l'existence. (Paris: Classiques Garnier, 2015) [in French]
 Herer, Maximilian: Spinoza: Die Philosophie der Wahrheit und der Erkenntnis. (Jerusalem: Israel Universities Press, 1971) [in German]
 Hervet, Céline: De l'imagination à l'entendement. La puissance du langage chez Spinoza. (Paris: Classiques Garnier, 2012) [in French]
 Hernández Pedrero, Vicente: Ética de la inmanencia. El factor Spinoza. (La Laguna: Universidad de La Laguna, 2011)  [in Spanish]
 Heydenreich, Karl Henrich: Natur und Gott nach Spinoza. (Leipzig: Müller, 1789) [in German]
 Hirsch, Leo: Gespräch im Nebel, Leibniz trifft Spinoza. (Berlin: Philo-Verlag, 1935) [in German]
 Høffding, Harald: Spinozas Ethica: Analyse und Charakteristik. (Heidelberg: Carl Winter, 1924) [in German]
 Hoekjen, Jan Hendrik: Pars melior nostri: The Structure of Spinoza's Intellect. (Ph.D. thesis, Utrecht University, 2018)
 Hoff, Josef: Die Staatslehre Spinoza's mit besonderer Berücksichtigung der einzelnen Regierungsformen und der Frage nach dem besten Staate. (Prag: Druck von Jakob B. Brandeis, 1895) [in German]
 Homan, Matthew Harvey: Spinoza's Way of Ideas. (Ph.D. diss., Emory University, 2012)
 Hong, Han-ding: Spinoza und die deutsche Philosophie. Eine Untersuchung zur metaphysischen Wirkungsgeschichte des Spinozismus in Deutschland. (Aalen: Scientia Verlag, 1989) [in German]
 Hoogendoorn, Adrie: De Filosofie van Spinoza. Uitleg van de Ethica. (Lochem: Windas, 2016) [in Dutch]
 Hoogendoorn, Adrie: Spinoza's Briefwisseling. Begin van de Radicale Verlichting.  (Lochem: Windas, 2016) [in Dutch]
 Hoogendoorn, Adrie: Spinoza over Godsdienst en Politiek. Uitleg van het Theologisch-politiek traktaat en het Staatkundig vertoog. (Lochem: Windas, 2016) [in Dutch]
 Hoos, Anneliese: Self-Preservation and Love in Spinoza's "Ethics". (Ph.S. diss., Columbia University, 2000)
 Horn, J. E.: Spinoza's Staatslehre. Zum ersten Male dargestellt. (Dresden: L. Ehlermann, 1863) [in German]
 Horner, Andreas: Zur Einführung in den Spinozismus. (Leipzig: O. Wigand, 1891) [in German]
 Hoyos Sánchez, Inmaculada: Naturalismo y pasión en la filosofia de Spinoza. Las fuentes antiguas de la teoría spinozista de las pasiones. (Ph.D. diss., Universidad de Granada, 2011) [in Spanish]
 Hubbeling, Hubertus Gezinus: Spinoza's Methodology. (Assen: Van Gorcum & Comp., 1964)
 Hünler, Solmaz Zelyut: Spinoza. (İstanbul: Paradigma Yayınları, 2003) [in Turkish]
 Hunter, Graeme: Radical Protestantism in Spinoza's Thought. (Aldershot, UK: Ashgate Publishing, 2005)
 Iannucci, Marco: La libertà umana nell'Etica di Spinoza. (Napoli: Orthotes Editrice, 2017) [in Italian]
 Iannucci, Marco: Libertà politica e religione in Spinoza. Saggio sul «Trattato teologico-politico» e sul «Trattato politico». (Milano: Mimesis, 2019) [in Italian]
 Illuminati, Augusto: Spinoza atlantico. (Milano: Edizioni Ghibli, 2009) [in Italian]
 Israël, Nicolas: Spinoza: Le temps de la vigilance. (Paris: Payot, 2001) [in French]
 Jackson, Hannibal: Eternal and Expansive Super Necessitarianism: A New Interpretation of Spinoza's Metaphysics. (Ph.D. diss., University of Iowa, 2016)
 Jacobi, Friedrich Heinrich: Über die Lehre des Spinoza in Briefen an den Herrn Moses Mendelssohn. (Breslau: Gottl. Löwe, 1785) [in German]
 Jacobi, Friedrich Heinrich: Friedrich Heinrich Jacobi wider Mendelssohns Beschuldigungen betreffend die Briefe über die Lehre des Spinoza. (Leipzig: Georg Joachim Goeschen, 1786) [in German]
 Jacobi, Friedrich Heinrich: Werke, I: Schriften zum Spinozastreit. [Eds.: Klaus Hammacher & Walter Jaeschke]. (Hamburg: Felix Meiner Verlag, 1998) [in German]
 Jacobi, Friedrich Heinrich; et al.: El ocaso de la ilustración. La polémica del Spinozismo. Selección de textos, traducción estudio preliminar y notas de María Jimena Solé. (Buenos Aires: Editorial de la Universidad Nacional de Quilmes, 2013) [in Spanish]
 James, Susan: Spinoza on Philosophy, Religion, and Politics: The Theologico-Political Treatise. (New York: Oxford University Press, 2012)
 Janssen, Ralf: Die Bestimmung der Negation im. Zusammenhang von Spinozas Philosophie des Absoluten. (Aachen: Hochschulschrift, 1992) [in German]
 Jaquet, Chantal: Sub specie æternitatis: Étude des concepts de temps, durée et éternité chez Spinoza. (Paris: Kimé, 1997) [in French]
 Jaquet, Chantal: Spinoza ou la prudence. (Paris: Éditions Quintette, 1997) [in French]
 Jaquet, Chantal: Les expressions de la puissance d'agir chez Spinoza. (Paris: Publications de la Sorbonne, 2005) [in French]
 Jaquet, Chantal: Spinoza o la prudencia. Traducción de Axel Cherniavsky. (Buenos Aires: Tinta Limón Ediciones, 2008) [in Spanish]
 Jaquet, Chantal: L'unità del corpo e della mente. Affetti, azioni e passioni in Spinoza. Traduzione di Raffele Carbone. (Milano: Mimesis, 2013) [in Italian]
 Jaquet, Chantal: La unidad del cuerpo y de la mente. Afectos, acciones y pasiones en Spinoza. Traducción de María Ernestina Garbino y Cecilia Paccazochi. (Córdoba, Argentina: Editorial Brujas, 2014) [in Spanish]
 Jaquet, Chantal: L'unité du corps et de l'esprit. Affects, actions passions chez Spinoza. (Paris: PUF, 2004) [in French]
 Jaquet, Chantal: Spinoza à l'œuvre. Composition des corps et force des idées. (Paris: Éditions de la Sorbonne, 2017) [in French]
 Jaquet, Chantal: Affects, Actions and Passions in Spinoza: The Unity of Body and Mind. Translated from the French by Tatiana Reznichenko. (Edinburg: Edinburgh University Press, 2018)
 Jing, An: Sur la transformation spinoziste de l'idée de transcendantal dans la première philosophie de G. Deleuze. (PhD diss., Université de Toulouse-Le Mirail – Toulouse II, 2013) [in French]
 Joachim, Harold H.: A Study of the 'Ethics' of Spinoza. (Oxford: Clarendon Press, 1901)
 Joachim, Harold H.: Spinoza's 'Tractatus de Intellectus Emendatione': A Commentary. (Oxford: Clarendon Press, 1940)
 Jobani, Yuval: The Role of Contradictions in Spinoza's Philosophy: The God-Intoxicated Heretic. Translated by Aviv Ben-O. (New York: Routledge, 2016)
 Joël, Manuel: Spinoza's Theologisch-Politischer Traktat, auf seine Quellen hin geprüft. (Breslau: Schletter'sche Buchhandlung: 1870) [in German]
 Joël, Manuel: Zur Genesis der Lehre Spinozas, mit besonderer Berücksichtigung des kurzen Traktats von Gott, dem Menschen und dessen Glückseligkeit. (Breslau: Schletter'sche Buchhandlung, 1871) [in German]
 Juffermans, Paul: Drie perspectieven op religie in het denken van Spinoza. Een onderzoek naar de verschillende betekenissen van religie in het oeuvre van Spinoza. (Budel: Damon, 2003) [in Dutch]
 Juffé, Michel: Café-Spinoza. (Paris: Le bord de l'eau, 2017) [in French]
 Juillet, Jean-Pierre: Des vues de Spinoza. Arguments et figures de la "philosophie vraie" [Travaux et documents du Groupe de Recherches Spinozistes, Nº10]. (Paris: Presses de l'Université Paris-Sorbonne, 2001) [in French]
 Jung, Mathias: Spinoza: Gott ist Natur, Natur ist Gott. (Lahnstein: Emu-Verlag, 2005) [in German]
 Kaim, J.R.: Die Philosophie Spinozas. (München: Rösl & Cie, 1921) [in German]
 Kalischer, Alfred Christlieb: Benedikt (Baruch) von Spinoza's Stellung zum Judenthum und Christenthum. Als Beitrag zur Lösung der Judenfrage beleuchtet. (Berlin: Carl Habel, 1884) [in German]
 Kalpokas, Ignas: Creativity and Limitation in Political Communities: Spinoza, Schmitt and Ordering. (New York, NY: Routledge, 2018)
 Kaminsky, Gregorio: Spinoza, la política de las pasiones. (Buenos Aires: Gedisa, 1990) [in Spanish]
 Karoui-Bouchoucha, Faten: Spinoza et la question de la puissance. (Paris: L'Harmattan, 2010) [in French]
 Kellermann, Benzion: Die Ethik Spinozas. Über Gott und Geist. (Berlin: C. A. Schwetschke & Sohn / Verlagsbuchhandlung, 1922) [in German]
 Kettner, Frederick: Spinoza: The Biosopher. Introduction by Nicholas Roerich. (New York: Roerich Museum Press, 1932)
 Kirchmann, J. H. von: Erläuterungen zu Benedict von Spinoza's Abhandlung über die Verbesserung des Verstandes und zu dessen Politischer Abhandlung. (Berlin: L. Heimann, 1871) [in German]
 Kirchmann, J. H. von: Erläuterungen zu Benedict von Spinoza's Briefwechsel. (Berlin: L. Heimann, 1872) [in German]
 Kisner, Matthew J.: Spinoza on Human Freedom: Reason, Autonomy and the Good Life. (Cambridge: Cambridge University Press, 2011) 
 Kizuk, Sarah: Individuation and Individuality: A Reading of Spinoza's Physical Interlude. (Masters thesis, Memorial University of Newfoundland, 2014)
 Klajnman, Adrien: Méthode et art de penser chez Spinoza. (Paris: Kimé, 2006) [in French]
 Klijnsmit, A. J.: Spinoza and Grammatical Tradition. (Leiden: Brill, 1986)
 Kluz, Christopher Ryszard: Determinism, Freedom, and Ethics: Spinozistic Interventions in the Contemporary Discussions of Responsibility. (Ph.D. diss., Emory University, 2010)
 Knol, Jan: En je zult spinazie eten. Aan tafel bij Spinoza, filosoof van de blijdschap. (Amsterdam: Wereldbibliotheek, 2007) [in Dutch]
 Knol, Jan: Spinoza uit zijn gelijkenissen en voorbeelden. Voor iedereen. (Amsterdam: Wereldbibliotheek, 2007) [in Dutch]
 Knol, Jan: Spinoza's intuïtie. (Amsterdam: Wereldbibliotheek, 2009) [in Dutch]
 Knol, Jan: Spinoza in 107 vragen & antwoorden. (Amsterdam: Wereldbibliotheek, 2015) [in Dutch]
 Koistinen, Olli: On the Metaphysics of Spinoza's Ethics. (Ph.D. diss., University of Turku, 1991)
 Koistinen, Olli (ed.): The Cambridge Companion to Spinoza's 'Ethics. (Cambridge, UK: Cambridge University Press, 2009)
 Kołakowski, Leszek: Nauka Spinozy o wyzwoleniu człowieka. (PhD diss., Uniwersytet Warszawski / University of Warsaw, 1953) [in Polish]
 Kołakowski, Leszek: Jednostka i nieskończoność: Wolność i antynomie wolności w filozofii Spinozy. (Warszawa: Państwowe Wydawnictwo Naukowe, 1958) [in Polish]
 Koyré, Alexandre: Scritti su Spinoza e l'averroismo. A cura di Andrea Cavazzini. (Milano: Ghibli, 2002) [in Italian]
 Krakauer, Moses: Zur Geschichte des Spinozismus in Deutschland während der ersten Hälfte des achtzehnten Jahrhunderts. (Breslau: S. Schottlaender, 1881) [in German]
 Kriegel, Blandine: Spinoza: L'autre voie. (Paris: Les Éditions du Cerf, 2018) [in French]
 Labriola, Antonio: Scritti e appunti su Zeller e su Spinoza (1862–1868). (Milano: Feltrinelli, 1959) [in Italian]
 Labriola, Antonio: Origine e natura delle passioni secondo l'Etica di Spinoza. A cura di M. Zanantoni. (Milano: Ghibli, 2004) [in Italian]
 Labriola, Antonio: Tra Hegel e Spinoza. Scritti 1863–1868. A cura di A. Savorelli e A. Zanardo. (Napoli: Bibliopolis, 2015) [in Italian]
 Lachièze-Rey, Pierre: Les origines cartésiennes du Dieu de Spinoza. (Paris: Vrin, 1950) [in French]
 Lacroix, Jean: Spinoza et le problème du salut. (Paris: P.U.F., 1970) [in French]
 Lagrée, Jacqueline: Spinoza et le débat religieux. Lectures du Traité théologico-politique. (Rennes: Presses Universitaires de Rennes, 2004) [in French]
 Laerke, Mogens: Leibniz lecteur de Spinoza. La genése d'une opposition complexe. (Paris: Honoré Champion, 2008) [in French]
 Lamm, Julia A.: The Living God: Schleiermacher's Theological Appropriation of Spinoza. (University Park, PA: Pennsylvania State University Press, 1996)
 Lamonica, Gabriella: Democrazia e mutamento. La via spinoziana al contrattualismo. (Roma: Aracne, 2009) [in Italian]
 Lapini, Walter: Spinoza e le inezie puerili. (Genova: Il Nuovo Melangolo, 2010) [in Italian]
 Laroche, Rémi: Tentatives de compréhension des 10 premières propositions de l'Éthique de Spinoza. (MA thesis, Université Laval, 2015) [in French]
 Laux, Henri: Imagination et religion chez Spinoza. La Potentia dans l'histoire. (Paris: Vrin, 1993) [in French]
 Laveran, Sophie: Le Concours des parties. Critique de l'atomisme et redéfinition du singulier chez Spinoza. (Paris: Classiques Garnier, 2014) [in French]
 Lazzeri, Christian (ed.): Spinoza: Puissance et impuissance de la raison. (Paris: Presses Universitaires de France, 2016) [in French]
 LeBuffe, Michael: From Bondage to Freedom: Spinoza on Human Excellence. (Oxford: Oxford University Press, 2010) 
 LeBuffe, Michael: Spinoza on Reason. (Oxford: Oxford University Press, 2018) 
 Legeay, Vincent: L'essence plastique: Aptitudes et accommodement chez Spinoza. (Paris : Éditions de la Sorbonne, 2018) [in French]
 Legeay, Vincent: « Être apte » chez Spinoza. Histoire et significations. [Coll. Les Anciens et les Modernes – Études de philosophie]. (Paris: Classiques Garnier, 2020) [in French]
 Lehmann, Friedrich: Beitrag zur Geschichte und zur Kritik des Spinozismus. (Siegen: Druck von W. Vorländer, 1898) [in German]
 Leibniz, Gottfried Wilhelm: Réfutation inédite de Spinoza [ed. Alexandre Foucher de Careil]. (Paris: E. Brière, 1854) [in French]
 Lenoir, Frédéric: Le miracle Spinoza. Une philosophie pour éclairer notre vie. (Paris: Fayard, 2017) [in French]
 Lenoir, Frédéric: El milagro Spinoza: Una filosofía para iluminar nuestra vida. Traducción de Ana Herrera Ferrer. (Barcelona: Editorial Ariel, 2019) [in Spanish]
 Lenoir, Frédéric: Spinoza Mucizesi, çev. Aslı Sümer. (İstanbul: Türkiye İş Bankası Kültür Yayınları, 2020) [in Turkish]
 Leonhardt, Kurt: Der Selbsterhaltungstrieb als Grundlage für die Ethik bei Spinoza. (Leipzig: Buchdruckerei von Heinrich John, 1907) [in German]
 Lermond, Lucia: The Form of Man: Human Essence in Spinoza's Ethic. (Leiden: E.J. Brill, 1988)
 Levene, Nancy K.: Spinoza's Revelation: Religion, Democracy, and Reason. (Cambridge: Cambridge University Press, 2004)
 Levi, Sergio: Spinoza e il problema mente-corpo. (Milano: CUEM, 2004) [in Italian]
 Lévêque, Raphaël: Le problème de la vérité dans la philosophie de Spinoza. (Paris: Les Belles-Lettres, 1923) [in French]
 Licata, Giovanni: La via della ragione: Elia del Medigo e l'averroismo di Spinoza. (Macerata: Edizioni Università di Macerata, 2013) [in Italian]
 Lin, Martin: Being and Reason: An Essay on Spinoza's Metaphysics. (New York: Oxford University Press, 2019)
 Lins, Daniel Soares: Expressão: Espinosa em Deleuze, Deleuze em Espinosa. (Rio de Janeiro: Editora Forense Universitária, 2009) [in Portuguese]
 Lloyd, Genevieve: Part of Nature: Self Knowledge in Spinoza's Ethics. (Ithaca, NY: Cornell University Press, 1994)
 Löwith, Karl: Spinoza: Deus sive Natura. Edizione italiana a cura di Orlando Franceschelli. (Roma: Donzelli, 1999) [in Italian]
 Lombardo, Mario G.: La mente affettiva di Spinoza. Teoria delle idee adeguate. (Padova: Il Poligrafo, 2004) [in Italian]
 Lord, Beth: Spinoza's 'Ethics': An Edinburgh Philosophical Guide. (Edinburgh: Edinburgh University Press, 2010)
 Lord, Beth: Kant and Spinozism: Transcendental Idealism and Immanence from Jacobi to Deleuze. (Basingstoke: Palgrave Macmillan, 2011) 
 Lordon, Frédéric: L'intérêt souverain. Essai d'anthropologie économique spinoziste. (Paris: La Découverte, 2006) [in French]
 Lordon, Frédéric: Capitalisme, désir et servitude: Marx et Spinoza. (Paris: La Fabrique, 2010) [in French]
 Lordon, Frédéric: Kapitalizm, niewola i pragnienie. Marks i Spinoza [Tłum. Magdalena Kowalska & Michał Kozłowski]. (Warszawa: Książka i Prasa, 2012) [in Polish]
 Lordon, Frédéric: Capitalismo, deseo y servidumbre: Marx y Spinoza. Traducción de Sebastián Puente. (Buenos Aires: Tinta Limón, 2015) [in Spanish] 
 López Pulido, Alfredo: Spinoza: Razón y Poder. Un estudio sobre el sujeto ético político en Spinoza. (Ph.D. diss., Universidad Nacional de Educación a Distancia, Madrid, 2013) [in Spanish]
 MacGregor, Phillip S.: Spinoza and Religious Philosophy. (PhD diss., Fordham University, 1952)
 Macherey, Pierre: Hegel ou Spinoza. (Paris: François Maspero, 1979) [in French]
 Macherey, Pierre: Avec Spinoza. Études sur la doctrine et l'histoire du spinozisme. (Paris: Presses Universitaires de France, 1992) [in French]
 Macherey, Pierre: Introduction à l'Éthique de Spinoza. La cinquième partie: Les voies de la libération. (Paris: PUF, 1994) [in French]
 Macherey, Pierre: Introduction à l'Éthique de Spinoza. La quatrième partie: La condition humaine. (Paris: PUF, 1997) [in French]
 Macherey, Pierre: Introduction à l'Éthique de Spinoza. La troisième partie: La vie affective. (Paris: PUF, 1995) [in French]
 Macherey, Pierre: Introduction à l'Éthique de Spinoza. La deuxième partie: La réalité mentale. (Paris: PUF, 1997) [in French]
 Macherey, Pierre: Introduction à l'Éthique de Spinoza. La première partie: La nature des choses. (Paris: PUF, 1998) [in French]
 Macherey, Pierre: Hegel o Spinoza. Traducción de Ma. del Carmen Rodríguez. (Buenos Aires: Tinta Limón, 2006) [in Spanish]
 Macherey, Pierre: Hegel or Spinoza. Translated from the French by Susan M. Ruddick. (Minneapolis: University of Minnesota Press, 2011) 
 Macherey, Pierre: Hegel ve/veya Spinoza, çev. Işık Ergüden. (İstanbul: Otonom Yayıncılık, 2013) [in Turkish]
 Macherey, Pierre: Hegel o Spinoza. Traduzione di Emilia Marra. (Verona: Ombre Corte, 2016) [in Italian]
 Macherey, Pierre: Sagesse ou ignorance? La question de Spinoza. (Paris: Éditions Amsterdam, 2019) [in French]
 MacQuesten, Rockwood: Higher Criticism and the Philosophical Outgrowth of Spinozism. (PhD diss., New York University, 1893)
 Malinowski-Charles, Syliane: Affects et conscience chez Spinoza. L'automatisme dans le progrès éthique. (Hildesheim: Georg Olms, 2004) [in French]
 Manzi-Manzi, Sandra: Individuo e relazione nella filosofia di Spinoza. (Ph.D. diss., Università degli Studi di Parma, 2016) [in Italian]
 Manzini, Frédéric: Spinoza: Une lecture d'Aristote. (Paris: PUF, 2009) [in French]
 Manzini, Frédéric: Spinoza: Textes choisis et présentés. (Paris: Seuil, 2010) [in French]
 Manzini, Frédéric: Spinoza et ses scolastiques. Retour aux sources et nouveaux enjeux. (Paris: Presses de l'Université Paris-Sorbonne, 2011) [in French]
 Marbach, Gotthard Oswald: Gedächtnissrede auf Benedict von Spinoza, gehalten vor einer Versammlung seiner akademischen Mitbürger am 21. Februar 1831. (Halle: Friedrich Ruff, 1831) [in German]
 Mark, Thomas Carson: Spinoza's Theory of Truth. (New York: Columbia University Press; Montreal: McGill-Queen's University Press, 1972)
 Marshall, Eugene: The Spiritual Automaton: Spinoza's Science of the Mind. (Oxford: Oxford University Press, 2013) 
 Martinetti, Piero: La religione di Spinoza. Quattro saggi. A cura di Amedeo Vigorelli. (Milano: Ghibli, 2002) [in Italian]
 Martinetti, Piero: Spinoza. A cura di Francesco Saverio Festa. (Roma: Castelvecchi, 2017) [in Italian]
 Martinetti, Piero: Scritti su Spinoza. A cura di Francesco Saverio Festa. (Roma: Castelvecchi, 2020) [in Italian]
 Martínez, Francisco José Martínez: Autoconstitución y libertad: ontología y política en Espinosa. (Barcelona: Anthropos, 2007) [in Spanish]
 Mason, Richard: The God of Spinoza: A Philosophical Study. (Cambridge: Cambridge University Press, 1997)
 Mason, Richard: Spinoza: Logic, Knowledge and Religion. (Aldershot, UK: Ashgate Publishing, 2007)
 Massima, Louwoungou: L'individu, le corps et les affects: Anthropologie et politique chez Spinoza. (Ph.D. diss., Université Michel de Montaigne – Bordeaux III, 2013) [in French]
 Matheron, Alexandre: Individu et communauté chez Spinoza. (Paris: Éditions de Minuit, 1968) [in French]
 Matheron, Alexandre: Le Christ et le salut des ignorants chez Spinoza. (Paris: Aubier-Montaigne, 1970) [in French]
 Matheron, Alexandre: Anthropologie et politique au XVIIe siècle. Études sur Spinoza. (Paris: Vrin, 1986) [in French]
 Matheron, Alexandre: Scritti su Spinoza. A cura di Filippo Del Lucchese. (Milano: Edizioni Ghibli, 2009) [in Italian]
 Matthes, Ewald: Die Unsterblichkeitslehre des Benedictus Spinoza (Heidelberg: J. Hörning, 1892) [in German]
 Maurer, Theodor: Die religionslehre Spinozas im Theologisch-politischen traktat. (Strassburg: Druck der Strassburger neuesten Nachrichten, vrm. H.L. Kayser, 1898) [in German]
 Mauthner, Fritz: Spinoza Ein Umriß seines Lebens und Wirkens. (Berlin: Schuster & Loeffler, 1906) [in German]
 Mauthner, Fritz: Spinoza: Ein Umriß seines Lebens und Wirkens [2nd ed.]. (Dresden: Carl Reissne, 1921) [in German]
 McKeon, Richard: The Philosophy of Spinoza: The Unity of His Thought. (New York: Longmans, Green and Co., 1928)
 McMurtrie, William McGillivray: Spinoza: Ontology and the Political. (Ph.D. diss., Cardiff University, 2011)
 McShea, Robert J.: The Political Philosophy of Spinoza. (New York: Columbia University Press, 1968)
 Mehlis, Georg: Spinozas leben und lehre. (Freiburg im Breisgau: Ernst Guenther Verlag, 1923) [in German]
 Melamed, Yitzhak Y.: Spinoza's Metaphysics: Substance and Thought. (New York: Oxford University Press, 2012)
 Meli, Fausto: Spinoza e due antecedenti Italiani dello spinozismo. (Firenze: G. C. Sansoni Editore, 1934) [in Italian]
 Menzel, Adolf: Wandlungen in der Staatslehre Spinoza's. (Stuttgart: J. G. Cotta'sche Buchhandlung, 1898) [in German]
 Menzel, Adolf: Mirabeau und die Menschenrechte. Der Sozialvertrag bei Spinoza. (Wien: A. Hölder, 1907) [in German]
 Meschonnic, Henri: Spinoza, poème de la pensée. (Paris: Maisonneuve & Larose, 2002) [in French]
 Meschonnic, Henri: Spinoza, poema del pensamiento. Traducción de Hugo Savino. (Buenos Aires: Editorial Cactus / Tinta Limón Ediciones, 2015) [in Spanish]
 Messeri, Marco: L'epistemologia di Spinoza. Saggio sui corpi e le menti. (Milano: Il Saggiatore, 1990) [in Italian]
 Mignini, Filippo: Ars imaginandi. Apparenza e rappresentazione in Spinoza. (Napoli: Edizioni Scientifiche Italiane, 1981) [in Italian]
 Mignini, Filippo (ed.): Dio, l'uomo, la libertà. Studi sul «Breve Trattato» di Spinoza. A cura di Filippo Mignini. (L'Aquila: Japadre, 1990) [in Italian]
 Mignini, Filippo: L'Etica di Spinoza. Introduzione alla lettura. (Roma: Carocci, 2002) [in Italian]
 Millet, Louis: Pour connaître la pensée de Spinoza. (Paris: Bordas, 1970) [in French]
 Millet, Louis: Pour connaître Spinoza [2nd ed.]. (Paris: Bordas, 1986) [in French]
 Milner, Jean-Claude: Le sage trompeur. Libres raisonnements sur Spinoza et les Juifs. Court traité de lecture 1. (Paris: Verdier, 2013) [in French]
 Miquel, Christian: L'éthique de la joie avec Spinoza. Transformer les passions tristes en béatitude. (Genève: Éditions Jouvence, 2019) [in French]
 Misrahi, Robert: Le désir et la réflexion dans la philosophie de Spinoza. (Paris: Gordon & Breach, 1972) [in French]
 Misrahi, Robert: Le corps et l'esprit dans la philosophie de Spinoza. (Paris: Les Empêcheurs de tourner en rond, 1992) [in French]
 Misrahi, Robert: Spinoza: Le système du monde, la réalisation de soi et la félicité. (Paris: Éditions Jacques Grancher, 1992) [in French]
 Misrahi, Robert: Spinoza: Un itinéraire du bonheur par la joie. (Paris: Éditions Jacques Grancher, 1992) [in French]
 Misrahi, Robert: L'être et la joie. Perspectives synthétiques sur le spinozisme. (Paris: Encre Marine, 1997) [in French]
 Misrahi, Robert: Spinoza et le spinozisme. (Paris: Armand Colin, 1998) [in French]
 Misrahi, Robert: Spinoza: Une philosophie de la joie. (Paris: Éditions Médicis-Entrelacs, 2005) [in French]
 Misrahi, Robert: 100 mots sur l'Éthique de Spinoza. (Paris: Les Empêcheurs de tourner en rond, 2005) [in French]
 Misrahi, Robert: 100 woorden over de Ethica van Spinoza. Vertaald uit het Frans door Frans van Zetten. (Amsterdam: Atlas, 2007) [in Dutch]
 Misrahi, Robert: Spinoza Sözlüğü, çev. Ece Durmuş. (İstanbul: Otonom Yayıncılık, 2019) [in Turkish]
 Moder, Gregor: Hegel und Spinoza: Negativität in der gegenwärtigen Philosophie. Aus dem Slowenischen von Alfred Leskovec. (Vienna: Turia + Kant, 2012) [in German]
 Moder, Gregor: Hegel and Spinoza: Substance and Negativity. (Evanston, IL: Northwestern University Press, 2017)
 Molinu, Nino Cornelio: Letture spinoziane. Spinoza nel contesto del pensiero occidentale. (Roma: Carocci, 2003) [in Italian]
 Molthan, Agnes: Über das normative und das deskriptive Element in der Ethik Spinozas. (Borna-Leipzig: Druck von R. Noske, 1917) [in German]
 Montano, Aniello: Spinoza e i filosofi. (Firenze: Le Lettere, 2011) [in Italian]
 Montano, Aniello: Ontologia e storia. Vico versus Spinoza. (Napoli: Bibliopolis, 2015) [in Italian]
 Moreau, Denys: Spinoza, un kif compliqué. Lecture distraite et illustrée divisée en à peu près cinq parties. (Montpellier: 6 Pieds sous Terre Editions, 2018) [in French]
 Moreau, Pierre-François: Spinoza: L'expérience et l'éternité. Recherches sur la constitution du système spinoziste. (Paris: PUF, 1994) [in French]
 Moreau, Pierre-François: Spinoza en het Spinozisme: Een inleiding. Vertaald uit het Frans door Jeroen Bartels. (Budel: Damon, 2004) [in Dutch]
 Moreau, Pierre-François: Spinoza: État et religion. (Lyon: ENS Éditions, 2005) [in French]
 Moreau, Pierre-François: Problèmes du spinozisme. (Paris: Vrin, 2006) [in French]
 Moreau, Pierre-François: Spinoza e lo spinozismo. A cura di Francesco Tomasoni. (Brescia: Morcelliana, 2007) [in Italian]
 Moreau, Pierre-François: Spinoza et le spinozisme. (Paris: Presses Universitaires de France – PUF, 2003) [in French]
 Moreau, Pierre-François: Spinoza y el spinozismo. Traducción de Pedro Lomba Falcón. (Madrid: Escolar y Mayo, 2012) [in Spanish]
 Moreau, Pierre-François: Spinoza: Filosofia, física y ateismo. Traducción de Pedro Lomba Falcón. (Madrid: Antonio Machado Libros, 2014) [in Spanish]
 Morfino, Vittorio: Il tempo e l'occasione. L'incontro Spinoza-Machiavelli. (Milano: LED Edizioni Universitarie, 2002) [in Italian]
 Morfino, Vittorio: Il tempo della moltitudine. Materialismo e politica prima e dopo Spinoza. (Roma: Manifestolibri, 2005) [in Italian]
 Morfino, Vittorio: Incursioni spinoziste. Causa, tempo, relazione. (Milano: Mimesis, 2006) [in Italian]
 Morfino, Vittorio: Plural Temporality: Transindividuality and the Aleatory Between Spinoza and Althusser. (Leiden: Brill, 2014)
 Mugnier-Pollet, Lucien: La philosophie politique de Spinoza. (Paris: Vrin, 1976)
 Nadler, Steven: Spinoza's Heresy: Immortality and the Jewish Mind. (Oxford: Oxford University Press, 2002) 
 Nadler, Steven: L'eresia di Spinoza. L'immortalità e lo spirito ebraico. Traduzione di Davide Tarizzo. (Torino: Einaudi, 2005) [in Italian]
 Nadler, Steven: Spinoza's Ethics: An Introduction. (Cambridge: Cambridge University Press, 2006) 
 Nadler, Steven: De ketterij van Spinoza. (Amsterdam/Antwerpen: Atlas, 2008) [in Dutch]
 Nadler, Steven: A Book Forged in Hell: Spinoza's Scandalous Treatise and the Birth of the Secular Age. (Princeton, NJ: Princeton University Press, 2011)
 Nadler, Steven: Un libro forgiato all'inferno. Lo scandaloso trattato di Spinoza e la nascita della secolarizzazione. Traduzione di Luigi Giacone. (Torino: Einaudi, 2013) [in Italian]
 Nadler, Steven: Spinoza filosofo morale, a cura di Matteo Favaretti Camposampiero. (Milano: Editoriale Jouvence, 2015) [in Italian]
 Nadler, Steven: La via alla felicità. L'etica di Spinoza nella cultura del Seicento. (Milano: Ulrico Hoepli Editore, 2018) [in Italian]
 Nadler, Steven: Think Least of Death: Spinoza on How to Live and How to Die. (Princeton, NJ: Princeton University Press, 2020)
 Næss, Arne; Wetlesen, Jon: Conation and Cognition in Spinoza's Theory of Affects: A Reconstruction. (Oslo: University of Oslo, 1967)
 Næss, Arne: Freedom, Emotion and Self-Subsistence: The Structure of a Central Part of Spinoza's Ethics. (Oslo: University of Oslo Press, 1975)
 Næss, Arne: Equivalent Terms and Notions in Spinoza's Ethics, Inquiry. (Oslo: Institute of Philosophy, University of Oslo, 1976)
 Næss, Arne: La réalisation de soi. Spinoza, le bouddhisme et l'écologie profonde. Suivi de "L'expérience du monde" de Stéphane Dunand. Traduction de Pierre Madelin. (Paris: Éditions Wildproject, 2017) [in French]
 Nativelle, Jean-Luc: Une lecture de Spinoza: 5 clés pour entrer dans l'Éthique. (Nantes: Éditions M-Éditer, 2018) [in French]
 Negri, Antonio: L'anomalia selvaggia. Saggio su potere e potenza in Baruch Spinoza. (Milano: Feltrinelli, 1981) [in Italian]
 Negri, Antonio: L'anomalie sauvage. Puissance et pouvoir chez Spinoza. Traduit de l'italien par François Matheron. Préfaces de Gilles Deleuze, Pierre Macherey et Alexandre Matheron. (Paris: PUF, 1982; Paris: Éditions Amsterdam, 2007) [in French] 
 Negri, Antonio: Die wilde Anomalie: Baruch Spinozas Entwurf einer freien Gesellschaft. Aus dem Italienischen von Werner Rait. (Berlin: Wagenbach, 1982) [in German]
 Negri, Antonio: The Savage Anomaly: The Power of Spinoza's Metaphysics and Politics. Translated from the Italian by Michael Hardt. (Minneapolis: University of Minnesota Press, 1991)
 Negri, Antonio: Spinoza sovversivo. Variazioni (in)attuali. (Roma: Antonio Pellicani Editore, 1992) [in Italian]
 Negri, Antonio: La anomalía salvaje. Ensayo sobre poder y potencia en Baruch Spinoza. Traducción del italiano de Gerardo de Pablo. (Barcelona: Anthropos, 1993) [in Spanish]
 Negri, Antonio: Spinoza subversif. Variations (in)actuelles [Trad. M. Raiola et F. Matheron]. (Paris: Kimé, 1994) [in French]
 Negri, Antonio: Spinoza subversivo. Traducción de Raúl Sánchez Cedillo. (Madrid: Akal, 2000) [in Spanish]
 Negri, Antonio: Subversive Spinoza: (Un)Contemporary Variations. [Translated from the Italian by Timothy S. Murphy et al.]. (Manchester: Manchester University Press, 2004) 
 Negri, Antonio: Yaban Kuraldışılık: Spinoza Metafiziğinin ve Siyasetinin Gücü, çev. Eylem Canaslan. (İstanbul: Otonom Yayıncılık, 2005) [in Turkish]
 Negri, Antonio: Spinoza et nous [coll. «La philosophie en effet»]. (Paris: Éditions Galilée, 2010) [in French]
 Negri, Antonio: Spinoza y nosotros. Traducción de Judith Revel. (Buenos Aires: Nueva Visión, 2011) [in Spanish]
 Negri, Antonio: Aykırı Spinoza, çev. Eylem Canaslan ve Nurfer Çelebioğlu. (İstanbul: Otonom Yayıncılık, 2011) [in Turkish]
 Negri, Antonio: Spinoza e noi. (Milano-Udine: Mimesis, 2012) [in Italian]
 Negri, Antonio: Spinoza for Our Time: Politics and Postmodernity. Translated from the French by William McCuaig. (New York: Columbia University Press, 2013)
 Negri, Antonio: Biocapitalismo. Entre Spinoza y la constitución política del presente. (Buenos Aires: Quadrata-Iluminuras, 2014) [in Spanish]
 Negri, Antonio: Espinosa subversivo e outros escritos. Tradução de Herivelto Pereira de Souza. (Belo Horizonte: Autêntica, 2016) [in Portuguese]
 Negri, Antonio: Spinoza. (Roma: DeriveApprodi, 2018) [in Italian]
 Newlands, Samuel: Reconceiving Spinoza. (Oxford, UK: Oxford University Press, 2018)
 Nocentini, Lucia: Il luogo della politica. Saggio su Spinoza. (Pisa: ETS, 2001) [in Italian]
 Norris, Christopher: Spinoza and the Origins of Modern Critical Theory. (Oxford: Basil Blackwell, 1991)
 Nossig, Alfred: Über die bestimmende Ursache des Philosophirens. Versuch einer praktischen Kritik der Lehre Spinozas. (Stuttgart: Deutsche Verlags-Anstalt, 1895) [in German]
 Nourrisson, Jean-Félix: Spinoza et le naturalisme contemporain. (Paris: Didier et Cie, 1866) [in French]
 Nyden-Bullock, Tammy: Spinoza's Radical Cartesian Mind. (New York: Continuum, 2007) 
 O'brien, Robert Charles: The Achievement of Selfhood and the Life of Reason in the 'Ethics' of Spinoza. (Ph.D. diss., Fordham University, 1968)
 Oliva Ríos, Mariela: La inmanencia del deseo. Un estudio sobre la subjetividad ética y el amor a la existencia en Spinoza. (Ciudad de México/México, D.F.: Universidad Autónoma de la Ciudad de México / Editorial Gedisa, 2015) [in Spanish]
 Ossadnik, Florian: Spinoza und der "wissenschaftliche Atheismus" des 21. Jahrhunderts. Ethische und politische Konsequenzen frühaufklärischer und gegenwärtiger Religionskritik. (Weimar: VDG [Verl. und Datenbank für Geisteswiss], 2011) [in German]
 Otto, Eduard: Zur Beurteilung und Würdigung der Staatslehre Spinozas. (Darmstadt: Druck C. F. Winter, 1897) [in German]
 Ottolenghi, Franco: Contraddanza: Appunti per un saggio sul padre come eroe spinoziano, in forma di dialogo. (Bergamo: Moretti & Vitali, 1994) [in Italian]
 Oudin, Charles: Le Spinozisme de Montesquieu. Étude critique. (Paris: F. Pichon et Durand-Auzias, 1911) [in French]
 Pacchiani, Claudio: Spinoza tra teologia e politica. (Abano Terme, Padova: A. Francisci, 1979) [in Italian]
 Pagliano, Sara: Debitus ordo: Tradizione ed originalità del metodo in Spinoza. (Dottorato di ricerca in filosofia, Università degli Studi di Milano, 2010) [in Italian]
 Pallassini, Alessandro: Finitezza e Sostanza. Sulla fondazione della libertà politica nella metafisica di Spinoza. (Pistoia: Petite Plaisance, 2017) [in Italian]
 Pandolfi, Alessandro: La libertà religiosa nel pensiero di Spinoza. (Cosenza: Pellegrini, 1989) [in Italian]
 Parens, Joshua: Maimonides and Spinoza: Their Conflicting View of Human Nature. (Chicago: University of Chicago Press, 2012)
 Parrice, Marie: Buddhist Aspects of Spinoza's Thought. (PhD diss., City University of New York, 1992)
 Park, Sam-Yel: A Study of the Mind-Body Theory in Spinoza. (PhD thesis, University of Glasgow, 1999)
 Pasig, Walter: Spinozas Rationalismus und Erkenntnislehre im Lichte des Verhältnisses von Denken und Ausdehnung (Leipzig: Druck von Ramm & Seemann, 1892) [in German]
 Paulus, Heinrich Eberhard Gottlob (ed.): Benedicti de Spinoza: Opera quae supersunt omnia [2 vols.]. (Jena: In Bibliopolio Academico, 1802–3) [in Latin]
 Pautrat, Bernard: Ethica sexualis: Spinoza et l'amour. (Paris: Payot, 2011) [in French]
 Peña García, Vidal: El materialismo de Spinoza. Ensayo sobre la Ontología Spinozista. (Madrid: Revista de Occidente, 1974) [in Spanish]
 Perdigón Lesmes, Cristhian: Spinoza: el amor al conocimiento. Reciprocidad entre epistemología, teología y ética. (Bogotá: Editorial Universidad del Rosario, 2010) [in Spanish]
 Pessel, André: Dans l'Ethique de Spinoza. (Paris: Klincksieck, 2018) [in French]
 Pethick, Stuart: Affectivity and Philosophy after Spinoza and Nietzsche: Making Knowledge the Most Powerful Affect. (Basingstoke: Palgrave Macmillan, 2015) 
 Petry, Michael J. (trans., ed.): Spinoza's Algebraic Calculation of the Rainbow and Calculation of Chances. Edited and translated with an introduction, explanatory notes and an appendix by Michael J. Petry. (Dordrecht: Martinus Nijhoff, 1985) 
 Pézeril, Daniel: Spinoza l'étranger [Texte établi par Florence Delay]. (Paris: Les Éditions du Cerf, 2007) [in French]
 Picton, James Allanson: Spinoza: A Handbook to the Ethics. (London: Archibald Constable & Co., 1907)
 Piguet, Jean-Claude: Le Dieu de Spinoza. (Genève: Labor et Fides, 1987) [in French]
 Pineda, Víctor Manuel: Horror vacui. Voluntad y deseo en el pensamiento de Spinoza. (Morelia, México: Universidad Michoacana de San Nicolás de Hidalgo / Plaza y Valdés, 2009) [in Spanish]
 Pineda, Víctor Manuel: El temor y la esperanza. La filosofía política de Spinoza. (Buenos Aires: Biblos, 2015) [in Spanish]
 Pizarro Suescum, José Pedro: El comercio de las cosas singulares: Inteligencia, afectividad y política en Baruj Spinoza. (Ph.D. diss., Universidad de Sevilla, 2017) [in Spanish]
 Powell, Elmer Ellsworth: Spinoza Gottesbegriff. (Halle: Max Niemeyer, 1899) [in German]
 Pozzi, Patrizia; Grassi, Paola (eds.): Quaderni Spinoziani: Spinoza dei miracoli. Con Atti del Seminario di Studi «L'impostura ieri e oggi: dai miracoli alla televisione». A cura di Patrizia Pozzi e Paola Grassi. (Milano: Ghibli, 2004) [in Italian]
 Pozzi, Patrizia: Visione e parola. Un'interpretazione del concetto spinoziano di scientia intuitiva. Tra finito e infinito. (Milano: Franco Angeli, 2012) [in Italian]
 Pozzi, Patrizia: Homo homini deus. L'ideale umano di Spinoza. (Milano: Mimesis, 2019) [in Italian]
 Ponczek, Roberto Leon: Deus ou seja a Natureza: Spinoza e os novos paradigmas da Física. (Salvador, Brasil: EDUFBA, 2009) [in Portuguese]
 Powell, Elmer Ellsworth: Spinoza and Religion a Study of Spinoza's Metaphysics and of His Particular Utterances in Regard to Religion, with a View to Determining the Significance of His Thought for Religion and Incidentally His Personal Attitude Toward It. (Chicago: The Open Court Publishing Co., 1906)
 Powell, Elmer Ellsworth: Spinoza and Religion [2nd ed.]. (Boston: Chapman and Grimes, 1941)
 Prelorentzos, Yannis: Temps, durée et éternité dans les "Principes de la philosophie de Descartes" de Spinoza [Travaux et documents du Groupe de Recherches Spinozistes, Nº6]. (Paris: Presses de l'Université Paris-Sorbonne, 1996) [in French]
 Preus, J. Samuel: Spinoza and the Irrelevance of Biblical Authority. (Cambridge, UK: Cambridge University Press, 2001)
 Preus, J. Samuel: Spinoza e la Bibbia. L'irrilevanza dell'autorità. (Brescia: Paideia Editrice, 2015) [in Italian]
 Préposiet, Jean: Spinoza et la liberté des hommes. (Paris: Gallimard, 1967) [in French]
 Proietti, Omero: La città divisa: Flavio Giuseppe, Spinoza e i farisei. (Roma: Il Calamo, 2003) [in Italian]
 Rabouin, David: Vivre ici: Spinoza, éthique locale. (Paris: Presses Universitaires de France, 2010) [in French]
 Rackwitz, Max: Studien über Causalität und Identität als Grundprincipien des Spinozismus. Ein kritischer Versuch. (Halle: Druck von E. Karras, 1884) [in German]
 Radliński, Ignacy: Spinoza: Rzecz Historyczno-Społeczna. (Warszawa: Skład Główny w Księgarni Centnerszwera i S-ki, 1910) [in Polish]
 Ramond, Charles: Qualité et quantité dans la philosophie de Spinoza. (Paris: Presses Universitaires de France, 1995) [in French]
 Ramond, Charles: Spinoza et la pensée moderne: Constitutions de l'objectivité. (Paris: L'Harmattan, 1998) [in French]
 Ramond, Charles: Le vocabulaire de Spinoza. (Paris: Ellipses, 1999) [in French]
 Ramond, Charles: Dictionnaire Spinoza. (Paris: Ellipses, 2007) [in French]
 Ramond, Charles: Spinoza Sözlüğü, çev. Bilgesu Şişman. (İstanbul: Say Yayınları, 2014) [in Turkish]
 Ramond, Charles: Spinoza contemporain: Philosophie, Éthique, Politique. (Paris: L'Harmattan, 2016) [in French]
 Ramos-Alarcón Marcín, Luis: El concepto de "ingenium" en la obra de Spinoza. Análisis ontológico, epistemológico, ético y político. (Ph.D. diss., Universidad de Salamanca, 2008) [in Spanish]
 Rauh, Frédéric: Quatenus doctrina quam Spinoza de fide exposuit cum tota ejusdem philosophia cohaereat. (Tolosae: A. Chauvin, 1890) [in Latin]
 Rauschenbach, Michael Christopher: Spinoza's Isolationism. (Ph.D. diss., University of Notre Dame, 2018)
 Ravera, Marco: Invito al pensiero di Spinoza. (Milano: Ugo Mursia Editore, 1987) [in Italian]
 Rawls, Christina: Spinoza's Ethology: Recognizing Dynamic Transitions between Imagination, Reason, and Intuition. (PhD diss., Duquesne University, 2015)
 Regensburg, Joseph: Über die Abhängigkeit der Seelenlehre Spinoza's von seiner Körperlehre und über die Beziehungen dieser beiden zu seiner Erkenntnistheorie. (Riga: Druck von Schnakenburg, 1900) [in German]
 Rensi, Giuseppe: Spinoza. (Milano: Fratelli Bocca, 1942) [in Italian]
 Rensi, Giuseppe: Spinoza, a cura di Aniello Montano. (Milano: Guerini e Associati, 1993) [in Italian]
 Renz, Ursula: The Explainability of Experience: Realism and Subjectivity in Spinoza's Theory of the Human Mind. (Oxford: Oxford University Press, 2018)
 Rice, Stephen Sheldon: Spinoza and Neuropsychology: A Comparison of Theories of Emotion, Methodology and Ontology. (MA thesis, McMaster University, 1989)
 Richter, Gustav Theodor: Spinozas philosophische Terminologie. Historisch und immanent kritisch untersucht. (Leipzig: J. A. Barth, 1913) [in German]
 Rivaud, Albert: Les notions d'essence et d'existence dans la philosophie de Spinoza. (Paris: F. Alcan, 1906) [in French]
 Rizk, Hadi: Comprendre Spinoza. (Paris: Armand Colin, 2006) [in French]
 Rizk, Hadi: Spinoza: l'expérience et l'infini. (Paris: Armand Colin, 2012) [in French]
 Rizk, Hadi: Spinoza'yı Anlamak, çev. Işık Ergüden. (İstanbul: İletişim Yayınları, 2012) [in Turkish]
 Robinson, Lewis: Kommentar zu Spinozas Ethik. (Leipzig: Meiner Verlag, 1928) [in German]
 Robredo, Jean-François: Suis-je libre? Désir, nécessité et liberté chez Spinoza. (Paris: Les Belles Lettres, 2015) [in French]
 Röd, Wolfgang: Benedictus de Spinoza. Eine Einführung. (Stuttgart: Reclam, 2002) [in German]
 Rödel, Patrick: Spinoza, le masque de la sagesse. Biographie imaginaire. (Castelnau-le-Lez: Climats, 1997) [in French]
 Roothaan, Angela: Vroomheid, vrede, vrijheid: Een interpretatie van Spinoza's Tractatus Theologico-Politicus. (Assen: Van Gorcum, 1996) [in Dutch]
 Roth, Wolff-Michael: The Mathematics of Mathematics: Thinking with the Late, Spinozist Vygotsky. (Rotterdam: Sense Publishers, 2017)
 Roth, Wolff-Michael; Jornet, Alfredo: Understanding Educational Psychology: A Late Vygotskian, Spinozist Approach. (Dordrecht: Springer, 2017)
 Rotta, Paolo: Spinoza. (Milano: Edizioni Athena, 1925) [in Italian]
 Rotthier, Rudi: De naakte perenboom. Op reis met Spinoza. (Amsterdam: Atlas Contact, 2013) [in Dutch]
 Rousset, Bernard: La Perspective finale de «l'Éthique» et le problème de la cohérence du spinozisme. L'autonomie comme salut. (Paris: Vrin, 1968) [in French]
 Rousset, Bernard: Spinoza, lecteur des «Objections» faites aux «Méditations» de Descartes et deses «Réponses». (Paris: Kimé, 1996) [in French]
 Rousset, Bernard: Geulincx entre Descartes et Spinoza. (Paris: Vrin, 1999) [in French]
 Rousset, Bernard: L'immanence et le salut. Regards spinozistes. (Paris: Kimé, 2000) [in French]
 Rovère, Maxime: Exister: Méthodes de Spinoza. (Paris: CNRS Éditions, 2010) [in French]
 Rüdiger, Otto: Studien zur Spinozarezeption in Deutschland im 18. Jahrhundert. (Frankfurt am Main: Peter Lang, 1994) [in German]
 Runes, Dagobert D.: Spinoza Dictionary. With a foreword by Albert Einstein. (New York: Philosophical Library, 1951)
 Runes, Dagobert D.: Benedictus de Spinoza: Letters to Friend and Foe. (New York: Philosophical Library, 1966)
 Saccaro Del Buffa, Giuseppa: Alle origini del panteismo. Genesi dell'Ethica di Spinoza e delle sue forme di argomentazione. (Milano: Franco Angeli, 2004) [in Italian]
 Saint-Amand Vallejo, Elsa: Realidad y utopía en el pensamiento político de Baruch de Spinoza. (Ph.D. diss., Universidad Complutense de Madrid, 2012) [in Spanish]
 Saint-Amand Vallejo, Elsa: La Utopía Materialista de Spinoza. (Santo Domingo: Editora de la UASD, 2018) [in Spanish]
 Saintes, Amand: Histoire de la vie et des ouvrages de B. de Spinosa, fondateur de l'exégèse et de la philosophie modernes. (Paris: Jules Renouard, 1842) [in French]
 Saar, Martin: Die Immanenz der Macht. Politische Theorie nach Spinoza. (Berlin: Suhrkamp Verlag, 2013) [in German]
 Salinger, Richard: Spinozas Lehre von der Selbsterhaltung. (Berlin: Buchdnickerei von Gustav Schade, 1881)
 Salmeri, Giovanni: Doppia verità, doppio errore. La questione dell'uomo nell'«Etica» di Spinoza. (Roma: Studium, 1993) [in Italian]
 Samely, Alexander: Spinozas Theorie der Religion [Schriftenreihe der Spinoza-Gesellschaft; Band 2]. (Würzburg: Königshausen & Neumann, 1993) [in German]
 Sangiacomo, Andrea: Homo liber. Verso una morale spinoziana. (Milano: Mimesis, 2011) [in Italian]
 Sangiacomo, Andrea: L'essenza del corpo. Spinoza e la scienza delle composizioni. (Hildesheim: Georg Olms Verlag, 2014) [in Italian]
 Sangiacomo, Andrea: Spinoza on Reason, Passions, and the Supreme Good. (Oxford: Oxford University Press, 2019)
 Sarıalioğlu, Kenan: Spinoza: Bir İspinozun Sevgi Çağrısı. (Ankara: Fol Kitap, 2019) [in Turkish]
 Saule, Peggy: Le Spinozisme de Robert Bresson. Un cinéma éthique et moral. (Berlin: Éditions EUE, 2011) [in French]
 Schaefer, Alfred: Spinoza: Philosoph des europäischen Bürgertums. (Berlin: Berlin-Verlag Arno Spitz, 1989) [in German]
 Scheidemantel, Herman: Die Grundprobleme der Ethik Spinoza's: "Der Begriff der actio im Gegensatze zu dem der Passio in Spinoza's Ethik". (Leipzig: H. Haacke, 1898) [in German]
 Schenk, Kathleen Ketring: Active Suffering: An Examination of Spinoza's Approach to Tristita. (Ph.D. diss., University of South Florida, 2017)
 Schlerath, Franz: Spinoza und die Kunst. (Hellerau bei Dresden: Buchdruckerei Jakob Hegner, 1920) [in German]
 Schmalz, Carl: Die Grundbegriffe des ersten Buches der Ethik Spinoza's. (Berlin: Druck von Martin Oldenbourg, 1892) [in German]
 Schmitt, Elisabeth: Die unendlichen Modi bei Spinoza. (Leipzig: J. A. Barth, 1910) [in German]
 Schröder, Winfried: Spinoza in der deutschen Frühaufklärung. (Würzburg: Königshausen & Neumann, 1987) [in German]
 Schuster, Marcelo: Contorsión: Spinoza en la frontera. (México, D.F./Ciudad de México: Universidad Nacional Autónoma de México / Ediciones Sin Nombre, 2008) [in Spanish]
 Schuyt, Kees: Spinoza en de vreugde van het inzicht. Persoonlijke en politieke vrijheid in een stabiele democratie. (Amsterdam: Balans, 2017) [in Dutch]
 Scribano, Emanuela: Guida alla lettura dell'Etica di Spinoza. (Roma/Bari: Editori Laterza, 2008) [in Italian]
 Secker, Miles: Spinoza's Theory of Emotion in Relation to Vygotsky's Psychology and Damasio's Neuroscience. (PhD diss., University of East Anglia, 2014) 
 Segré, Ivan: Le manteau de Spinoza: pour une éthique hors la Loi. (Paris: La Fabrique, 2014) [in French]
 Segré, Ivan: Spinoza: The Ethics of an Outlaw. Translated from the French by David Broder. (London: Bloomsbury, 2017) 
 Seidel, Helmut: Baruch de Spinoza zur Einführung. (Hamburg: Junius Verlag, 1994) [in German]
 Serrano Marín, Vicente: La herida de Spinoza. Felicidad y política en la vida posmoderna. (Barcelona: Anagrama, 2011) [in Spanish]
 Sévérac, Pascal: Éthique de Spinoza. (Paris: Ellipses, 1997) [in French]
 Sévérac, Pascal: L'Appendice à la première partie de l'Éthique de Spinoza. (Paris: Ellipses, 1999) [in French]
 Sévérac, Pascal: Le devenir actif chez Spinoza. (Paris: Honoré Champion, 2005) [in French]
 Sévérac, Pascal: Spinoza: Union et désunion. (Paris: Vrin, 2011) [in French]
 Sharp, Hasana: Spinoza and the Politics of Renaturalization. (Chicago: University of Chicago Press, 2011)
 Siebrand, Heine Jurriaan: Spinoza and the Netherlanders: An Inquiry into the Early Reception of His Philosophy of Religion. (Assen/Maastricht: Van Gorcum, 1988)
 Signorile, Claudio: Politica e ragione. Spinoza e il primato della politica. (Padova: Marsilio, 1968) [in Italian]
 Sigwart, Christoph: Spinoza´s neuentdeckter Tractat von Gott, dem Menschen und dessen Glückseligkeit. (Gotha: R. Besser, 1866) [in German] (available at https://archive.org/details/spinozasneuentd00sigwgoog)
 Sigwart, Heinrich Christoph Wilhelm: Über den Zusammenhang des Spinozismus mit der Cartesianischen Philosophie. Ein philosophischer Versuch. (Tübingen: C. F. Osiander, 1816) [in German]
 Sigwart, Heinrich Christoph Wilhelm: Historische und philosophische Beiträge zur Erläuterung des Spinozismus. (Tübingen: Ernst Traugott Eifert, 1838) [in German]
 Sigwart, Heinrich Christoph Wilhelm: Der Spinozismus, historisch und philosophisch erläutert, mit Beziehung auf ältere und neuere Ansichten. (Tübingen: C. F. Osiander, 1839) [in German]
 Sini, Carlo: La verità pubblica e Spinoza. Lezioni universitarie. (Milano: CUEM, 1991) [in Italian]
 Sini, Carlo: Archivio Spinoza. La verità e la vita. (Milano: Ghibli, 2005) [in Italian]
 Siwek, Paul: Spinoza et le panthéisme religieux. (Paris: Desclée de Brouwer et Cie, 1937) [in French]
 Skeaff, Christopher: Becoming Political: Spinoza's Vital Republicanism and the Democratic Power of Judgment. (Chicago: University of Chicago Press, 2018)
 Smith, Steven B.: Spinoza, Liberalism, and the Question of Jewish Identity. (New Haven, CT: Yale University Press, 1997)
 Smith, Steven B.: Spinoza's Book of Life: Freedom and Redemption in the Ethics. (New Haven, CT: Yale University Press, 2003)
 Solé, María Jimena: Spinoza en Alemania (1670–1789). Historia de la santiﬁcación de un Filósofo maldito. (Córdoba, Argentina: Editorial Brujas, 2011) [in Spanish]
 Soyarslan, Sanem: Reason and Intuitive Knowledge in Spinoza's Ethics: Two Ways of Knowing, Two Ways of Living. (Ph.D. diss., Duke University, 2011)
 Spindler, Fredrika: Spinoza: Multitud, Affekt, Kraft [Spinoza: Multitude, Affect, Power]. (Göteborg: Glänta Produktion, 2009) [in Swedish]
 Sportelli, Silvano: Potenza e desiderio nella filosofia di Spinoza. (Napoli: Edizioni Scientifiche Italiane, 1995) [in Italian]
 Spruit, Leen; Totaro, Pina (eds.): The Vatican Manuscript of Spinoza's Ethica. (Leiden: Brill, 2011)
 Stahlberg, Ben: Spinoza's Philosophy of Divine Order. (New York: Peter Lang, 2015)
 Steinberg, Justin: Spinoza's Political Psychology: The Taming of Fortune and Fear. (Cambridge, UK: Cambridge University Press, 2018)
 Stenzel, Jürgen: Philosophie als Antimetaphysik. Zum Spinozabild Constantin Brunners [Schriftenreihe der Spinoza-Gesellschaft; Band 10]. (Würzburg: Königshausen & Neumann, 2002) [in German]
 Sterian, Moshe: Einführung in Das Ideenreich Spinozas. (Zürich: Diana Verlag, 1972) [in German]
 Stern, Jacob: Die Philosophie Spinozas. Erstmals gründlich aufgehellt und populär dargestellt. (Stuttgart: J. H. W. Dietz Verlag, 1890) [in German]
 Strathern, Paul: Spinoza in 90 Minutes. (Chicago: Ivan R. Dee, 1998)
 Strauss, Leo: Die Religionskritik Spinozas als Grundlage seiner Bibelwissenschaft. Untersuchungen zu Spinozas theologisch-politischem Traktat. (Berlin: Akademie-Verlag, 1930) [in German]
 Strauss, Leo: Spinoza's Critique of Religion. Translated from the German by Elsa M. Sinclair. (New York: Schocken Books, 1965)
 Strauss, Leo: La critique de la religion chez Spinoza ou Les fondements de la science spinoziste de la Bible: Recherches pour une étude du "Traité théologico-politique" [Trad. par Gérard Almaleh, Albert Baraquin et Mireille Depadt-Ejchenbaum]. (Paris: Les Éditions du Cerf, 1996) [in French]
 Strauss, Leo: Il testamento di Spinoza. A cura di Riccardo Caporali, traduzione di Enrico Zoffoli. (Milano: Mimesis, 2016) [in Italian]
 Streiff, Bruno: Le Peintre et le Philosophe ou Rembrandt et Spinoza à Amsterdam [Collection Privée]. (Paris: Éditions Complicités, 2002)  [in French]
 Suhamy, Ariel; Daval, Alia: Spinoza par les bêtes. (Paris: Ollendorff et Desseins, 2008) [in French]
 Suhamy, Ariel; Daval, Alia: Spinoza por las bestias. Traducción de Sebastián Puente. (Buenos Aires: Editorial Cactus, 2016) [in Spanish]
 Suhamy, Ariel; Daval, Alia: Spinoza ve Yaratıklar, çev. Mustafa Çağlar Atmaca. (İstanbul: Otonom Yayıncılık, 2018) [in Turkish]
 Suhamy, Ariel: Spinoza, un philosophe en équilibre. (Paris: Ellipses, 2018) [in French]
 Sunat, Halûk: Spinoza ve Psikanaliz ve Hayat. (İstanbul: Yirmidört Yayınları, 2008) [in Turkish]
 Sunat, Halûk: Psikanalitik Duyarlıklı Bakışla: Spinoza ve Felsefesi. (İstanbul: Bağlam Yayıncılık, 2014) [in Turkish]
 Szokolov, V.V.: Filosofija Spinozy i sovremennost / Философия Спинозы и современность [Spinoza's Philosophy and Modernity]. (Moskva: MGU, 1964) [in Russian]
 Szokolov, V.V.: Spinoza filozófiája és a jelenkor. (Budapest: Gondolat Könyvkiadó, 1981) [in Hungarian]
 Tatián, Diego: La cautela del salvaje. Pasiones y política en Spinoza. (Buenos Aires: Adriana Hidalgo, 2001) [in Spanish]
 Tatián, Diego: Spinoza y el amor del mundo. (Buenos Aires: Altamira, 2004) [in Spanish]
 Tatián, Diego: Una introducción a Spinoza. (Buenos Aires: Quadrata, 2009) [in Spanish]
 Tatián, Diego: Spinoza: Dünya Sevgisi, çev. Hüsam Turşucu ve Sevin Aksoy Hancı. (Ankara: Dost Kitabevi, 2009) [in Turkish]
 Tatián, Diego: Spinoza: El don de la filosofía. (Buenos Aires: Ediciones Colihue, 2012) [in Spanish]
 Tatián, Diego: Spinoza: Filosofía terrena. (Buenos Aires: Ediciones Colihue, 2014) [in Spanish]
 Tatián, Diego: Spinoza disidente. (Buenos Aires: Tinta Limón Ediciones, 2019) [in Spanish]
 Taute, Gottfried Friedrich: Der Spinozismus als unendliches Revolutionsprinzip und sein Gegensatz. (Königsberg: Tag & Koch, 1848) [in German]
 Thomas, James: Intuition and Reality: A Study of the Attributes of Substance in the Absolute idealism of Spinoza. (Aldershot, UK: Ashgate, 1999)
 Thomas, Karl: Spinoza als Metaphysiker vom Standpunkte der historischen Kritik. (Königsberg: In Commission bei Gräfe und Unzer, 1840) [in German]
 Thomas, Karl: Spinoza's Individualismus und Pantheismus. (Königsberg: Adolph Samter, 1848) [in German]
 Thomass, Balthasar: Être heureux avec Spinoza. (Paris: Eyrolles, 2008) [in French]
 Thomass, Balthasar: In compagnia di Spinoza. Raggiungere la felicità. Traduzione di A. P. Maestrini. (Cesena: BIS Edizioni, 2012) [in Italian]
 Tejeda Gómez, Cristian Andrés: Política y pasiones desde una perspectiva spinozista. La inmanencia en la filosofía de Spinoza y su potencia como herramienta político-afectiva. (PhD diss., Universitat de Barcelona, 2015) [in Spanish]
 Tejedor Campomanes, César: Una antropología del conocimiento. Estudio sobre Spinoza. (Madrid: UPCM, 1981) [in Spanish]
 Terrenal, Quintin C.: Causa sui and the Object of Intuition in Spinoza. (Cebu City, The Philippines: University of San Carlos, 1976)
 Timuçin, Ali: Spinoza'nın Özgürlük Kavrayışı. (İstanbul: Bulut Yayınları, 2016) [in Turkish]
 Tönnies, Ferdinand: La teoria sociale di Spinoza, a cura di Nicola Marcucci. (Milano: Mimesis, 2016) [in Italian]
 Tonelli, Ivana: La ferita non chiusa. La ricezione ebraica di Spinoza nel Novecento. (Alessandria: Edizioni dell'Orso, 2003) [in Italian]
 Toros, Yvonne: Espace et transformation: Spinoza. (Ph.D. diss., Université de Paris I, 1981) [in French]
 Toros, Yvonne: Spinoza et l'espace projectif. (Ph.D. diss., Université de Paris VIII, 1990) [in French]
 Tosel, André: Religion, politique, philosophie chez Spinoza. Essai sur le Traité théologico-politique et sur l'unité systématique de la pensée de Spinoza. (Thèse de doctorat d'État ès Lettres, Université Paris 1 Panthéon-Sorbonne, 1982) [in French]
 Tosel, André: Spinoza et le crépuscule de la servitude. Essai sur le Traité théologico-politique. (Paris: Aubier, 1984) [in French]
 Tosel, André: Du matérialisme de Spinoza. (Paris: Éditions Kimé, 1994) [in French]
 Tosel, André: Spinoza ou l'autre (in)finitude. (Paris: L'Harmattan, 2009)  [in French]
 Totaro, Pina (ed.): Spinoziana: Ricerche di terminologia filosofica e critica testuale. Seminario Internazionale (Roma, 29–30 settembre 1995). A cura di Pina Totaro. (Firenze: Leo S. Olschki, 1997) [in Italian]
 Toto, Francesco: L'individualità dei corpi. Percorsi nell'Etica di Spinoza. (Milano: Mimesis, 2014) [in Italian]
 Touber, Jetze: Spinoza and Biblical Philology in the Dutch Republic, 1660–1710. (Oxford, UK: Oxford University Press, 2018)
 Trendelenburg, Adolf: Über Spinoza's Grundgedanken und dessen Erfolg. (Berlin: Gustav Bethge, 1850) [in German]
 Trucchio, Aldo: Come guidati da un'unica mente. Questioni di antropologia politica in Baruch Spinoza [Spinoziana]. (Milano: Ghibli, 2007) [in Italian]
 Tumarkin, Anna: Spinoza: Acht Vorlesungen gehalten an der Universität Bern. (Leipzig: Quelle & Meyer,  1908) [in German]
 Türkmen, Sevinç: Aşkın Ontolojisi: Spinoza'yla Bir Yürüyüş. (İstanbul: İthaki Yayınları, 2018) [in Turkish]
 Valentiner, Wilhelm R.: Rembrandt and Spinoza: A Study of the Spiritual Conflicts in Seventeenth-Century Holland. (London: Phaidon Press, 1957)
 Vampoulis, Épaminondas: La physique de Spinoza. (Ph.D. diss., Université de Paris IV-Sorbonne, 2000) [in French]
 Van de Linde, Antonius: Spinoza. Seine Lehre und deren erste Nachwirkungen in Holland. Eine philosophisch-historische Monographie. (Göttingen: Van den Hoeck und Ruprecht, 1862) [in German]
 Van de Weyer, Robert: Spinoza in a Nutshell [Series Philosophers of the Spirit]. (London: Hodder & Stoughton, 1998)
 Van Reijen, Miriam: Spinoza: De geest is gewillig, maar het vlees is sterk. (Kampen: Klement, 2008) [in Dutch]
 Van Reijen, Miriam: Het Argentijnse gezicht van Spinoza. Passies en politiek. (Kampen: Klement, 2010) [in Dutch]
 Van Reijen, Miriam: Spinoza in bedrijf. Van passie naar actie. (Zoetermeer: Klement, 2013) [in Dutch]
 Vandewalle, Bernard: Spinoza et la médecine. Éthique et thérapeutique. (Paris: L'Harmattan, 2011) [in French]
 Vaysse, Jean-Marie: Totalité et subjectivité. Spinoza dans l'Idéalisme allemand. (Paris: Vrin, 1994) [in French]
 Verbeek, Theo: Spinoza's Theologico-Political Treatise: Exploring "the Will of God". (Aldershot, UK: Ashgate, 2003)
 Vernière, Paul: Spinoza et la pensée française avant la Révolution [2 vols.; Tome I: XVIIe siècle (1663–1715), Tome II: XVIIIe siècle]. (Paris: PUF, 1954) [in French]
 Viljanen, Valtteri: Spinoza's Geometry of Power. (Cambridge: Cambridge University, 2011)
 Vinale, Adriano: Organismo democratico. Tre saggi spinoziani. (Milano: Mimesis, 2008) [in Italian]
 Vincents, Kasper: The Spinozist Moment: Spinoza and the Democratic Republican Tradition. (MA thesis, University of Copenhagen, 2017)
 Vinciguerra, Lorenzo: Spinoza. (Paris: Hachette, 2001) [in French]
 Vinciguerra, Lorenzo: Spinoza et le signe. La genèse de l'imagination. (Paris: Vrin, 2005) [in French]
 Vinciguerra, Lorenzo: La semiotica di Spinoza. (Pisa: Edizioni ETX, 2012) [in Italian]
 Vinti, Carlo: La filosofia come «vitae meditatio». Una lettura di Spinoza. (Roma: Città Nuova, 1979) [in Italian]
 Vinti, Carlo: Spinoza: La conoscenza come liberazione. (Roma: Edizioni Studium, 1984) [in Italian]
 Visentin, Stefano: La libertà necessaria. Teoria e pratica della democrazia in Spinoza. (Pisa: ETS, 2001) [in Italian]
 Visentin, Stefano: El movimiento de la democracia. Antropología y política en Spinoza. Traducción de Agustín Volco. (Córdoba, Argentina: Editorial Encuentro, 2011) [in Spanish]
 Volkelt, Johannes: Pantheismus und Individualismus im Systeme Spinoza's. (Leipzig: A. Lorentz, 1872) [in German]
 Vulliaud, Paul: Spinoza d'après les livres de sa bibliothèque. (Sainte-Marguerite-sur-Mer: Éd. des Équateurs, 2012) [in French]
 Wachter, Johann Georg: Der Spinozismus im Jüdenthumb, oder, Die von dem heütigen Jüdenthumb und dessen Geheimen Kabbala vergötterte Welt. (Amsterdam: Johann Wolters, 1699) [in German]
 Wahle, Richard: Kurze Erklärung der Ethik von Spinoza und Darstellung der definitiven Philosophie. (Wien/Leipzig: Wilhelm Braumüller, 1899) [in German]
 Waller, Jason: Persistence through Time in Spinoza. (Lanham, MD: Lexington Books, 2012)
 Weissman, David: Spinoza's Dream: On Nature and Meaning. (Berlin: Walter de Gruyter, 2016)
 Wertheim, David J.: Salvation through Spinoza: A Study of Jewish Culture in Weimar Germany. (Leiden: Brill, 2011)
 Wetlesen, Jon: Internal Guide to the 'Ethics' of Spinoza: Index to Spinoza's Cross References in the 'Ethics', Rearranged So As To Refer from Earlier to Later Statements. (Oslo: University of Oslo, 1974)
 Wetlesen, Jon: The Sage and the Way: Studies in Spinoza's Ethics of Freedom. (Oslo: Institute of Philosophy, 1978)
 Wienpahl, Paul: The Radical Spinoza. (New York: New York University Press, 1979)
 Wiessner Friedrich Karl: Die Freiheit bei Spinoza. (Osterwieck: Zickfeldt, 1902) [in German]
 Winkle, Stefan: Die heimlichen Spinozisten in Altona und der Spinozastreit. (Hamburg: Verein für Hamburgische Gechichte, 1988) [in German] 
 Winkler, Sean: A Study of Individuality and Change in Spinoza's Philosophy. (PhD diss., KU Leuven, 2016)
 Wion, Matthew David: Spinoza on Individuals and Individuation: Metaphysics, Morals, and Politics. (Ph.D. diss., Marquette University, 2009)
 Wodnitzky, Y.: Consciousness in Spinoza's Ethics and George Eliot's Early Novels. (M.A. thesis, Utrecht University, 2014)
 Wolf, Abraham (trans., ed.): The Correspondence of Spinoza. (London: George Allen & Unwin, 1928)
 Wollenberg, David Lawrence: Desire and Democracy: Spinoza and the Politics of Affect. (Ph.D. diss., University of Chicago, June 2012)
 Worms, René: La morale de Spinoza. Examen de ses principes et de l'influence qu'elle a exercée dans les temps modernes. (Paris: Hachette, 1892) [in French]
 Wrzecionko, R.: Der Grundgedanke der Ethik des Spinoza. Eine Untersuchung über Inhalt und Methode der Metaphysik überhaupt und der Metaphysik des Spinoza im besonderen. (Wien: Braumüller, 1894) [in German]
 Yerushalmi, Yosef Hayim: Spinoza und das Überleben des jüdischen Volkes. Mit einem Anhang: Spanien und das Spanische in Spinozas Bibliothek. (München: Lehrstuhl für Jüdische Geschichte und Kultur, Inst. für Neuere Geschichte, 1999) [in German]
 Yoshiaki, Mihara: Reading T. S. Eliot Reading Spinoza. (PhD diss., Cornell University, 2013)
 Yoshida, Kazuhiko: Vernunft und Affektivität: Untersuchungen zu Spinozas Theorie der Politik [Schriftenreihe der Spinoza-Gesellschaft; Band 12]. (Würzburg: Königshausen & Neumann, 2004) [in German]
 Yovel, Yirmiyahu: Spinoza and Other Heretics, Vol. 1: The Marrano of Reason. (Princeton, NJ: Princeton University Press, 1989)
 Yovel, Yirmiyahu: Spinoza and Other Heretics, Vol. 2: The Adventures of Immanence. (Princeton, NJ: Princeton University Press, 1989)
 Yovel, Yirmiyahu: Spinoza et autres hérétiques. (Paris: Éditions du Seuil, 1991) [in French]
 Yovel, Yirmiyahu: Spinoza, el marrano de la razón. Traducción de M. Cohen. (Barcelona: Anaya & Mario Muchnik, 1995) [in Spanish]
 Zaoui, Pierre: Spinoza, la décision de soi. (Paris: Bayard, 2008) [in French]
 Zeitschel, Richard: Die Erkenntnislehre Spinoza's. (Langensalza: H. Beyer & Söhne, 1889) [in German]
 Zelyüt, Solmaz: Spinoza. (Ankara: Dost Kitabevi, 2010) [in Turkish]
 Zourabichvili, François: Le conservatisme paradoxale de Spinoza. Enfance et royauté. (Paris: PUF, 2002) [in French]
 Zourabichvili, François: Spinoza: Une physique de la pensée. (Paris: PUF, 2002) [in French]
 Zourabichvili, François: Spinoza: Una fisica del pensiero. Traduzione di Franco Bassani. (Mantova: Negretto Editore, 2012) [in Italian]
 Zourabichvili, François: Infanzia e regno. Il conservatorismo paradossale di Spinoza. Traduzione di Cristina Zaltieri. (Mantova: Negretto Editore, 2013) [in Italian]
 Zourabichvili, François: Spinoza: Una física del pensamiento. Traducción de Sebastián Puente. (Buenos Aires: Editorial Cactus, 2014) [in Spanish]
 Zucchello, Dario: Spinoza. (Bologna: Diogene Multimedia, 2015) [in Italian]
 Zweerman, Theo: L'Introduction à la philosophie selon Spinoza. Une analyse structurelle de l'introduction du Traité de la réforme de l'entendement suivie d'un commentaire de ce texte. (Louvain: Presses Universitaires de Louvain, 1993) [in French]
 Zweig, Arnold: The Living Thoughts of Spinoza. Selected with an introduction by Arnold Zweig. (New York: Longmans, Green and Co., 1939)
 Zweig, Arnold: El pensamiento vivo de Spinoza. Traducción por Francisco Ayala. (Buenos Aires: Editorial Losada, 1944) [in Spanish]
 Żelazna, Jolanta: Skończone poznanie ludzkie w filozofii Spinozy. (Toruń: Wydawnictwo Naukowe Uniwersytetu Mikołaja Kopernika, 1995) [in Polish]
 Żelazna, Jolanta: Substancja jak światło? Wybrane pojęcia i problemy filozofii Spinozy. (Toruń: Wydawnictwo Naukowe Uniwersytetu Mikołaja Kopernika, 2010) [in Polish]
 Żelazna, Jolanta: Spinozjańska teoria afektów. (Toruń: Wydawnictwo Naukowe Uniwersytetu Mikołaja Kopernika, 2010) [in Polish]

Collected essays
 Akal, Cemal Bâli; Ergün, Reyda (eds.): Kimlik Bedenin Hapishanesidir: Spinoza Üzerine Yazılar ve Söyleşiler. (İstanbul: İstanbul Bilgi Üniversitesi Yayınları, 2011) [in Turkish]
 Akal, Cemal Bâli; Antalyalı, Z. Efe (eds.): Spinoza Hukukçuya Ne Söyler?. (İstanbul: Zoe Kitap, 2019) [in Turkish]
 Altwicker, Norbert (ed.): Texte zur Geschichte des Spinozismus. (Darmstadt: Wissenschaftliche Buchgesellschaft, 1971) [in German]
 Balibar, Étienne; Seidel, Helmut; Walther, Manfred (eds.): Freiheit und Notwendigkeit: Ethische und politische Aspekte bei Spinoza und in der Geschichte des (Anti-)Spinozismus [Schriftenreihe der Spinoza-Gesellschaft; Band 3]. (Würzburg: Königshausen & Neumann, 1994) [in German]
 Barreto, Ana Claudia Gama; Bilate, Danilo; da Silva Barros, Tiago Mota (eds.): Spinoza e Nietzsche, filósofos contra a tradição. (Rio de Janeiro: Mauad X, 2012) [in Portuguese]
 Bartuschat, Wolfgang; Kirste, Stephan; Walther, Manfred (eds.): Naturalismus und Demokratie: Spinozas "Politischer Traktat" im Kontext seines Systems. Ein Kommentar. (Tübingen: Mohr Siebeck, 2014) [in German]
 Baumgarten, Jean; Rosier-Catach, Irène; Totaro, Pina (eds.): Spinoza, philosophe grammairien: Le Compendium grammatices linguae hebraeae. (Paris: CNRS Éditions, 2019) [in French]
 Becker, Rafael Cataneo; Fragoso, Emanuel Angelo da Rocha; Guimaraens, Francisco de; Itokazu, Ericka Mariee; Rocha, Maurício (eds.): Spinoza e nós, Vol. 1: Spinoza, a guerra e a paz. (Rio de Janeiro: Editora PUC-Rio, 2017) [in Portuguese]
 Becker, Rafael Cataneo; Fragoso, Emanuel Angelo da Rocha; Guimaraens, Francisco de; Itokazu, Ericka Mariee; Rocha, Maurício (eds.): Spinoza e nós, Vol. 2: Spinoza atual / inatual. (Rio de Janeiro: Editora PUC-Rio, 2017) [in Portuguese]
 Beeckman, Tinneke (ed.): Spinoza: Filosoof van de Blijheid. (Brussel: Uitgeverij ASP, 2010)  [in Dutch]
 Bento, António; Silva Rosa, José Maria (eds.): Revisiting Spinoza's "Theological-Political Treatise". (Hildesheim: Georg Olms Verlag, 2013)
 Blanco-Echauri, Jesús (ed.): Espinosa: Ética e política. (Santiago de Compostela: Universidade de Santiago de Compostela, 1999) [in Spanish]
 Bloch, Olivier; Macherey, Pierre (eds.): Spinoza au XXe siècle. Actes des Journées d'études organisées les 14 et 21 janvier, 11 et 18 mars 1990 à la Sorbonne par le Centre de recherche sur l'histoire des systèmes de pensée modernes de l'Université de Paris I-Panthéon-Sorbonne [UFR de philosophie]. (Paris: Presses Universitaires de France, 1993) [in French]
 Bohlmann, Carolin; Fink, Thomas; Weiss, Philipp (eds.): Lichtgefüge des 17. Jahrhunderts. Rembrandt und Vermeer – Spinoza und Leibniz. (München: Wilhelm Fink, 2008)  [in German]
 Bollacher, Martin; Kisser, Thomas; Walther, Manfred (eds.): Ein neuer Blick auf die Welt: Spinoza in Literatur, Kunst und Ästhetik [Schriftenreihe der Spinoza-Gesellschaft; Band 14]. (Würzburg: Königshausen & Neumann, 2010) [in German]
 Boros, Gábor (ed.): Individuum, közösség és jog Spinoza filozófiájában. (Budapest: Áron Kiadó, 2000) [in Hungarian]
 Bostrenghi, Daniela (ed.): Hobbes e Spinoza: Scienza e Politica. (Napoli: Bibliopolis, 1992) [in Italian]
 Bostrenghi, Daniela; Santinelli, Cristina (eds.): Spinoza: Ricerche e prospettive. Per una storia dello spinozismo in Italia. Atti delle Giornate di studio in ricordo di Emilia Giancotti, Urbino, 2–4 ottobre 2002. (Napoli: Bibliopolis, 2007) [in Italian]
 Bostrenghi, Daniela; Raspa, Venanzio; Santinelli, Cristina; Visentin, Stefano (eds.): Spinoza: La potenza del comune. (Hildesheim: Georg Olms Verlag, 2012) [in Italian]
 Bove, Laurent; Bras, Gérard; Méchoulan, Éric (eds.): Pascal et Spinoza. Pensée du contraste: de la géométrie du hasard à la nécessité de la liberté. (Paris: Éditions Amsterdam, 2007) [in French]
 Brodsky, Valentín; Farga, Gisel; et al. (eds.): Spinoza: Decimosegundo Coloquio – Spinoza y los otros. (Córdoba, Argentina: Universidad Nacional de Córdoba, 2017) [in Spanish]
 Brodsky, Valentín; Paccazochi, Cecilia (eds.): Spinoza: Decimoquinto Coloquio – El Spinozismo como forma de vida. (Córdoba, Argentina: Universidad Nacional de Córdoba, 2020) [in Spanish]
 Büttner, Stefan: Gott und Raum: Spinozas innovative Konzeption der Ausdehnung und Körperwelt [Schriftenreihe der Spinoza-Gesellschaft; Band 15]. (Würzburg: Königshausen & Neumann, 2011) [in German]
 Bubner, Rüdiger; Cramer, Konrad; Wiehl, Rainer (ed.): Spinoza, 1677–1977. (Göttingen: Vandenhoeck & Ruprecht, 1977) [in German]
 Butler, Benjamin: The Philosophy of Spinoza. (Boston: Student Outlines Company, 1939)
 Cabañas, Leticia; Esquisabel, Oscar M. (eds.): Leibniz frente a Spinoza. Una interpretación panorámica. (Granada: Comares, 2014) [in Spanish]
 Carbone, Raffaele; Jacquet, Chantal; Moreau, Pierre-François (eds.): Spinoza-Malebranche, à la croisée des interprétations. (Lyon: ENS Editions, 2018) [in French]
 Cámara, Maria Luisa de La; Fernández, Eugenio (eds.): El gobierno de los afectos en Baruj Spinoza. (Madrid: Editorial Trotta, 2007) [in Spanish]
 Cámara, Maria Luisa de La; Carvajal, Julián (eds.): Spinoza, de la física a la historia. (Cuenca: Ediciones de la Universidad de Castilla-La Mancha, 2008) [in Spanish]
 Cámara, Maria Luisa de La; Carvajal, Julián (eds.): Spinoza y la Antropología en la Modernidad. (Hildesheim: Georg Olms Verlag, 2017) [in Spanish]
 Chappell, Vere (ed.): Baruch de Spinoza. (New York: Garland Publishing, 1992)
 Charles-Daubert, F.; et al.: Lire et traduire Spinoza [Travaux et documents du Groupe de Recherches Spinozistes, Nº1]. (Paris: Presses de l'Université Paris-Sorbonne, 1989) [in French]
 Charles, Sylianne; Gagnon, Jacques-Henri (ed.): Spinoza sous le prisme de son anthropologie. (Québec: Société de philosophie du Québec, 2002) [in French]
 Chesnokov, G.D. (ed.): Mudryj i vechno molodoj B. Spinoza / Мудрый и вечно молодой Б. Спиноза [Wise and eternally young B. Spinoza]. (Moskva: Izdatel'stvo Rossiyskoi akademii gosudarstvenoi sluzhby, 1999) [in Russian]
 Cliteur, Paul; Pinto, David (eds.): Moord op Spinoza. De opstand tegen de verlichting en moderniteit. (Amsterdam: Uitgeverij Aspekt, 2018) [in Dutch]
 Cook, J. Thomas; Rice, Lee (eds.): Studia Spinozana, Vol. 14: Spinoza on Mind and Body. (Würzburg: Königshausen & Neumann, 2003)
 Cortès, Juan Vicente; Laveran, Sophie (eds.): Spinoza: La raison à l'épreuve de la pratique. (Paris: Publications de la Sorbonne, 2013) [in French] 
 Cramer, Konrad; Jacobs, Wilhelm G.; Schmidt-Biggemann, Wilhelm (eds.): Spinozas Ethik und ihre frühe Wirkung. (Wolfenbüttel: Herzog August Bibliothek, 1981) [in German]
 Cristofolini, Paolo (ed.): L'Hérésie Spinoziste: La Discussion sur le Tractatus Theologico-Politicus, 1670–1677. (Amsterdam: APA-Holland University Press, 1995) [in French]
 Cristofolini, Paolo (ed.): The Spinozistic Heresy: The Debate on the Tractatus Theologico-Politicus, 1670–1677, and the Immediate Reception of Spinozism [Proceedings of the International Cortona Seminar, 10–14 April 1991]. (Amsterdam: APA-Holland University Press, 1995)
 Curley, Edwin; Moreau, Pierre-François (eds.): Spinoza: Issues and Directions. (Leiden: E.J. Brill, 1990)
 Czelinski, Michael; et al. (eds.): Transformation der Metaphysik in die Moderne. Zur Gegenwärtigkeit der theoretischen und praktischen Philosophie Spinozas. (Würzburg: Königshausen & Neumann, 2003) [in German]
 De Deugd, Cornelis (ed.): Spinoza's Political and Theological Thought: International Symposium under the Auspices of the Royal Netherlands Academy of Arts and Sciences. Commemorating the 350th Anniversary of the Birth of Spinoza Amsterdam 24–27 November 1982. (Amsterdam: North Holland Publishing Company, 1984)
 De Dijn, Herman; Mignini, Filippo; van Rooden, P. (eds.): Studia Spinozana, Vol. 11: Spinoza's Philosophy of Religion. (Würzburg: Königshausen & Neumann, 1995)
 Domínguez, Atilano (ed.): Spinoza y España. Actas del Congreso Internacional sobre "Relaciones entre Spinoza y España" (Almagro, 5–7 noviembre 1992). (Ciudad Real: Ediciones de la Universidad de Castilla-La Mancha, 1994) [in Spanish]
 Fernández García, Eugenio; et al. (eds.): La encrucijada de los afectos. Ensayos Spinozistas. (Cuenca: Ediciones de la Universidad de Castilla-La Mancha, 2018)  [in Spanish]
 Fischer, Kuno; Renan, Ernest; Land, Jan Pieter Nicolaas; van Vloten, Johannes: Spinoza: Four Essays. Edited by William Angus Knight. (London: Williams and Norgate, 1882)
 Freeman, Eugene; Mandelbaum, Maurice (eds.): Spinoza: Essays in Interpretation. (LaSalle, IL: Open Court, 1975)
 Galcerán Huguet; Montserrat; Espinoza Pino, Mario (eds.): Spinoza contemporáneo. (Madrid: Tierradenadie Ediciones, 2009) [in Spanish]
 Garrett, Don (ed.): The Cambridge Companion to Spinoza. (Cambridge: Cambridge University Press, 1996)
 Gatens, Moira (ed.): Feminist Interpretations of Benedict Spinoza. (University Park, PA: Penn State University Press, 2009) 
 Giancotti, Emilia (ed.) Spinoza nel 350° anniversario della nascità. Atti del congresso internazionale (Urbino 4–8 ottobre 1982). (Napoli: Bibliopolis, 1985) [in Italian]
 Giannini, Humberto; Bonzi, Patricia; López, Eduardo (eds.): Spinoza. Coloquio Internacional organizado por la Universidad de Chile, Facultad de Filosofía y Humanidades. (Santiago de Chile: Dolmen Ediciones, 1996) [in Spanish]
 Goff, Philip (ed.): Spinoza on Monism [Philosophers in Depth]. (Basingstoke, UK: Palgrave Macmillan, 2012)
 Goldenbaum, Ursula; Kluz, Christopher (eds.): Doing without Free Will: Spinoza and Contemporary Moral Problems. (Lanham, MD: Lexington Books, 2015)
 Gomes, Carlos Wagner Benevides; da Rocha Fragoso, Emanuel Angelo; da Silva, H. Lima; Lima, F. J. Barros Sousa (eds.): VI Colóquio Benedictus de Spinoza: Potência, Cultura e Resistência. (Fortaleza, Ceará: EdUECE – Editora da Universidade Estadual do Ceará, 2018)  [in Portuguese]
 González, Horacio (ed.): Cóncavo y convexo. Escritos sobre Spinoza. (Buenos Aires: Altamira, 1999) [in Spanish]
 Grasset, Baptiste Noel Auguste; Fragoso, Emanuel Angelo da Rocha; Itokazu, Ericka Marie; Guimaraens, Francisco de; Rocha, Maurício (eds.): Spinoza e as Américas: X Colóquio Internacional Spinoza [Vol. 1]. (Fortaleza, Ceará: EdUECE – Editora da Universidade Estadual do Ceará, 2014) [in Portuguese & in Spanish]
 Grasset, Baptiste Noel Auguste; Fragoso, Emanuel Angelo da Rocha; Itokazu, Ericka Marie; Guimaraens, Francisco de; Rocha, Maurício (eds.): Spinoza e as Américas: X Colóquio Internacional Spinoza [Vol. 2]. (Fortaleza, Ceará: EdUECE – Editora da Universidade Estadual do Ceará, 2014) [in Portuguese & in Spanish]
 Grattan, Sean; Hitchcock, Peter (eds.): Marx or Spinoza. (Mediations: Journal of the Marxist Literary Group, Volume 25, Number 2, Winter 2011) 
 Grene, Marjorie (ed.): Spinoza: A Collection of Critical Essays. (Garden City, NY: Doubleday/Anchor Press, 1973)
 Grene, Marjorie; Nails, Debra (eds.): Spinoza and the Sciences. (Dordrecht: Reidel, 1986)
 Gründer, Karlfried; Schmidt-Biggemann, Wilhelm (eds.): Spinoza in der Frühzeit seiner religiösen Wirkung [Wolfenbütteler Studien zur Aufklärung; Bd. 12]. (Heidelberg: L. Schneider, 1984) [in German]
 Hammacher, Klaus (ed.): Spinoza und die moderne Wissenschaft [Schriftenreihe der Spinoza-Gesellschaft; Band 5]. (Würzburg: Königshausen & Neumann, 1998) [in German]
 Hammacher, Klaus; Reimers-Tovote, Irmela; Walther, Manfred (eds.): Zur Aktualität der Ethik Spinozas. Medizin/Psychiatrie – Ökonomie – Recht – Religion. Spinoza in der Geschichte der philosophischen Ethik [Schriftenreihe der Spinoza-Gesellschaft; Band 7]. (Würzburg: Königshausen & Neumann, 2000) [in German]
 Hampe, Michael; Schnepf, Robert (eds.): Baruch de Spinoza: Ethik in geometrischer Ordnung dargestellt. (Berlin: Akademie Verlag, 2006) [in German]
 Heerich, Thomas: Transformation des Politikkonzepts von Hobbes zu Spinoza: das Problem der Souveränität [Schriftenreihe der Spinoza-Gesellschaft; Band 8]. (Würzburg: Königshausen & Neumann, 2000) [in German]
 Hessing, Siegfried (ed.): Spinoza. Dreihundert Jahre Ewigkeit. Spinoza-Festschrift 1632–1932. (Den Haag: Martinus Nijhoff, 1962) [in German]
 Hessing, Siegfried (ed.): Speculum Spinozanum, 1677–1977. With a foreword by Huston Smith. (London: Routledge & Kegan Paul, 1977)
 Hindrichs, Gunnar (ed.): Die Macht der Menge: Über die Aktualität einer Denkfigur Spinozas. (Heidelberg: Carl Winter Universitätsverlag, 2006) [in German]
 Höffe, Otfried (ed.): Baruch de Spinoza: Theologisch-politischer Traktat. (Berlin: Akademie Verlag, 2014) [in German]
 Honnacker, Ana; Ruf, Matthias (eds.): Gott oder Natur. Perspektiven nach Spinoza. (Berlin–Münster: LIT Verlag, 2015) [in German]
 Hornäk, Sara: Spinoza und Vermeer: Immanenz in Philosophie und Malerei [Schriftenreihe der Spinoza-Gesellschaft; Band 11]. (Würzburg: Königshausen & Neumann, 2004) [in German]
 Hubert, Christiane; et al.: Les premières réfutations de Spinoza. Aubert de Versé, Wittich, Lamy [Travaux et documents du Groupe de Recherches Spinozistes, Nº5]. (Paris: Presses de l'Université Paris-Sorbonne, 1994) [in French]
 Huenemann, Charlie (ed.): Interpreting Spinoza: Critical Essays. (Cambridge: Cambridge University Press, 2008) 
 Israel, Jonathan I.; Silverthorne, Michael (trans., eds.): Spinoza: Theological-Political Treatise. (Cambridge: Cambridge University Press, 2007) 
 Jabase, Ana Leila; Meriles, Alejandra; Rivera, Francisco; et al. (eds.): Spinoza: Treceavo Coloquio – Spinoza Maledictus. (Córdoba, Argentina: Universidad Nacional de Córdoba, 2018) [in Spanish]
 Jaquet, Chantal; Coppens, Gunther; Bordoli, Roberto; Suhamy, Ariel: Les Pensées métaphysiques de Spinoza. (Paris: Publications de la Sorbonne, 2004) [in French]
 Jaquet, Chantal; Sévérac, Pascal; Suhamy, Ariel (eds.): Fortitude et servitude. Lectures de l'Éthique IV de Spinoza. (Paris: Éditions Kimé, 2003) [in French]
 Jaquet, Chantal; Sévérac, Pascal; Suhamy, Ariel (eds.): Spinoza, philosophe de l'amour. (Saint-Étienne: Publications de l'Université de Saint-Étienne, 2005) [in French]
 Jaquet, Chantal; Sévérac, Pascal; Suhamy, Ariel (eds.): La multitude libre. Nouvelles lectures du "Traité politique" de Spinoza. (Paris: Éditions Amsterdam, 2008) [in French]
 Jaquet, Chantal; Sévérac, Pascal; Suhamy, Ariel (eds.): La théorie spinoziste des rapports corps/esprit et ses usages actuels. (Paris: Éditions Hermann, 2009) [in French]
 Kashap, S. Paul (ed.): Studies in Spinoza: Critical and Interpretive Essays. (Berkeley: University of California Press, 1972)
 Kennington, Richard (ed.): The Philosophy of Baruch Spinoza. (Washington DC: Catholic University Press, 1980)
 Kibrick, Mauricio (ed.): Homenaje a Baruch Spinoza. Con motivo del tricentenario de su muerte. (Buenos Aires: Museo Judío de Buenos Aires, 1976) [in Spanish]
 Kisner, Matthew J.; Youpa, Andrew (eds.): Essays on Spinoza's Ethical Theory. (Oxford: Oxford University Press, 2014)
 Kisser, Thomas: Selbstbewußtsein und Interaktion: Spinozas Theorie der Individualität [Schriftenreihe der Spinoza-Gesellschaft; Band 6]. (Würzburg: Königshausen & Neumann, 1998) [in German]
 Kisser, Thomas; Wille, Katrin (eds.): Spinozismus als Modell?: Lektüren zu Deleuze und Spinoza. (München: Wilhelm Fink Verlag, 2015) [in German]
 Klever, Wim; Curley, Edwin; Mignini, Filippo (eds.): Studia Spinozana, Vol. 2: Spinoza's Epistemology. (Alling, Germany: Walther & Walther, 1986)
 Klever, Wim; Bollacher, Martin; Henrard, R. (eds.): Studia Spinozana, Vol. 5: Spinoza and Literature. (Würzburg: Königshausen & Neumann, 1989) 
 Klever, Wim; Beyssade, Jean-Marie; Wilson, M. (eds.): Studia Spinozana, Vol. 10: Spinoza and Descartes. (Würzburg: Königshausen & Neumann, 1994)
 Kogan, Barry S. (ed.): Spinoza: A Tercentenary Perspective. (Cincinnati: Hebrew Union College Press, 1979)
 Koistinen, Olli; Biro, John (eds.): Spinoza: Metaphysical Themes. (Oxford: Oxford University Press, 2001)
 Kordela, A. Kiarina; Vardoulakis, Dimitris (eds.): Spinoza's Authority, Volume I: Resistance and Power in Ethics. (New York: Bloomsbury Academic, 2017)
 Kordela, A. Kiarina; Vardoulakis, Dimitris (eds.): Spinoza's Authority, Volume II: Resistance and Power in the Political Treatises. (New York: Bloomsbury Academic, 2017)
 Landenne, Quentin; Storme, Tristan (eds.): L'actualité du Tractatus de Spinoza et la question théologico-politique. (Brussels: Éditions de l'Université de Bruxelles, 2014) [in French]
 Lloyd, Genevieve (ed.): Spinoza: Critical Assessments, Vol. I: Context, Sources and the Early Writings. (London: Routledge, 2001)
 Lloyd, Genevieve (ed.): Spinoza: Critical Assessments, Vol. II: The Ethics. (London: Routledge, 2001)
 Lloyd, Genevieve (ed.): Spinoza: Critical Assessments, Vol. III. (London: Routledge, 2001)
 Lloyd, Genevieve (ed.): Spinoza: Critical Assessments, Vol. IV: The Reception and Influence of Spinoza's Philosophy. (London: Routledge, 2001)
 Lord, Beth (ed.): Spinoza's Philosophy of Ratio. (Edinburgh: Edinburgh University Press, 2018)
 Lordon, Frédéric; Citton, Yves (eds.): Spinoza et les sciences sociales. De la puissance de la multitude à l'économie des affects. (Paris: Éditions Amsterdam, 2010) [in French] 
 Lordon, Frédéric; Debray, Eva; Kim Sang, Ong-Van-Cung: Spinoza, les passions du social. (Paris: Éditions Amsterdam, 2019)  [in French] 
 Maatsch, Jonas; Schneider, Johannes Ulrich (eds.): Spinoza. (München: Beck, 2011) [in German]
 Machado de Abreu, Luís (ed.): Sob o Olhar de Spinoza. Actes du Séminaire Portugais et Hispanique sur Spinoza tenu à l'Université de Aveiro (Portugal), les 13 et 14 novembre 1998. (Aveiro, Portugal: Departamento de Línguas e Culturas, 1999) [in Portuguese]
 Maidansky, Andrey; et al.: Benedikt Spinoza: pro et contra. Lichnost' i tvorchestvo B. Spinozy v otsenkakh russkikh myslitelei i issledovatelei: antologiia / Бенедикт Спиноза: pro et contra. Личность и творчество Б. Спинозы в оценках русских мыслителей и исследователей: антология [Benedict Spinoza: pro et contra: The personality and creativity of B. Spinoza in an appraisal of Russian thinkers and researchers: Anthology]. (Санкт-Петербург/Saint Petersburg: РХГА/RHGA, 2012) [in Russian]
 Marcucci, Nicola (ed.): Ordo e connexio. Spinozismo e scienze sociali. (Milano: Mimesis, 2012) [in Italian]
 Marcucci, Nicola; Zaltieri, Cristina (eds.): Spinoza e la storia. (Mantova: Negretto Editore, 2019) [in Italian]
 Martins, André; Santiago, Homero; Oliva, Luís César (eds.): As ilusões do eu: Spinoza e Nietzsche. (Rio de Janeiro: Civilizaçao Brasileira, 2011) [in Portuguese]
 Martínez, Francisco José (ed.): Spinoza en su siglo. (Madrid: Biblioteca Nueva, 2012) [in Spanish]
 Méchoulan, Henry; Nahon, Gérard (eds.): Mémorial I.-S. Révah. Études sur le marranisme, l'hétérodoxie juive et Spinoza. (Paris/Louvain: Peeters, 2001) [in French]
 Melamed, Yitzhak Y.; Rosenthal, Michael A. (eds.): Spinoza's 'Theological-Political Treatise': A Critical Guide. (Cambridge: Cambridge University Press, 2010) 
 Melamed, Yitzhak Y.; Förster, Eckart (eds.): Spinoza and German Idealism. (Cambridge: Cambridge University Press, 2012)
 Melamed, Yitzhak Y. (ed.): The Young Spinoza: A Metaphysician in the Making. (Oxford: Oxford University Press, 2015) 
 Melamed, Yitzhak Y. (ed.): Spinoza's 'Ethics': A Critical Guide. (Cambridge: Cambridge University Press, 2017)
 Melamed, Yitzhak Y.; Sharp, Hasana (eds.): Spinoza's Political Treatise: A Critical Guide. (Cambridge: Cambridge University Press, 2018) 
 Montag, Warren; Stolze, Ted (eds.): The New Spinoza. (Minneapolis: University of Minnesota Press, 1997)
 Moreau, Pierre-François: Spinoza entre Lumières et Romantisme. (Fontenay-aux-Roses: ENS Éditions, 1985) [in French]
 Moreau, Pierre-François; Mignini, Filippo; van Suchtelen, G. (eds.): Studia Spinozana, Vol. 4: Spinoza's Early Writings. (Würzburg: Königshausen & Neumann, 1989)
 Moreau, Pierre-François; et al.: Méthode et métaphysique [Travaux et documents du Groupe de Recherches Spinozistes, Nº2]. (Paris: Presses de l'Université Paris-Sorbonne, 1989) [in French]
 Moreau, Pierre-François; Carraud, V.; et al.: L'Ecriture Sainte au temps de Spinoza et dans le systéme spinoziste [Travaux et documents du Groupe de Recherches Spinozistes, Nº4]. (Paris: Presses de l'Université Paris-Sorbonne, 1992) [in French]
 Moreau, Pierre-François; Chiereghin, Franco; Vokos, Gerassimos (eds.): Studia Spinozana, Vol. 12: Spinoza and Ancient Philosophy. (Würzburg: Königshausen & Neumann, 1996)
 Moreau, Pierre-François; Giannini, Humberto; Vermeren, Patrice (eds.): Spinoza et la politique. Actes du Colloque de Santiago du Chili, 8–12 mai 1995. (Paris: L'Harmattan, 1997) [in French]
 Moreau, Pierre-François; Brugère, Fabienne (eds.): Spinoza et les affects [Travaux et documents du Groupe de Recherches Spinozistes, Nº7]. (Paris: Presses de l'Université Paris-Sorbonne, 1998) [in French]
 Moreau, Pierre-François; Bove, Laurent; et al.: La Recta Ratio: Criticiste et Spinoziste?. Mélanges offerts à Bernard Rousset. Textes réunis par Laurent Bove [Travaux et documents du Groupe de Recherches Spinozistes, Nº8]. (Paris: Presses de l'Université Paris-Sorbonne, 1999) [in French]
 Moreau, Pierre-François; Tosel, André; Salem, Jean (eds.): Spinoza au XIXe siècle. Actes des journées d'études organisées à la Sorbonne [9 et 16 mars, 23 et 30 novembre 1997]. (Paris: Publications de la Sorbonne, 2007) [in French]
 Moreau, Pierre-François; Cohen-Boulakia, Claude; Delbraccio, Mireille (eds.): Lectures contemporaines de Spinoza. (Paris: Presses de l'Université Paris-Sorbonne, 2012) [in French]
 Moreau, Pierre-François; Jaquet, Chantal (eds.): Spinoza transalpin. Les interprétations actuelles en Italie. (Paris: Publications de la Sorbonne, 2012) [in French]
 Moreau, Pierre-François; Andrault, Raphaële; Laerke, Mogens (eds.): Spinoza / Leibniz: Rencontres, Controverses, Réceptions. (Paris: Presses de l'université Paris-Sorbonne, 2014) [in French]
 Moreau, Pierre-François; Vinciguerra, Lorenzo (eds.): Spinoza et les arts. (Paris: L'Harmattan, 2020) [in French]
 Morfino, Vittorio (ed.): Spinoza contra Leibniz: Documenti di uno scontro intellettuale (1676–1678). A cura di Vittorio Morfino, prefazione di Etienne Balibar. (Milano: Edizioni Unicopli, 1994) [in Italian]
 Morfino, Vittorio (ed.): La Spinoza-Renaissance nella Germania di fine Settecento. (Milano: Edizioni Unicopli, 1998) [in Italian]
 Morfino, Vittorio; Del Lucchese, Filippo (eds.): Sulla scienza intuitiva in Spinoza. Ontologia, politica, estetica [Spinoziana]. (Milano: Edizioni Ghibli, 2003) [in Italian]
 Morfino, Vittorio; Caporali, Riccardo; Visentin, Stefano (eds.): Spinoza: individuo e moltitudine. (Cesena: Il Ponte Vecchio, 2007) [in Italian]
 Morfino, Vittorio; Del Lucchese, Filippo; Battistel, Gianluca (eds.): L'abisso dell'unica sostanza. L'immagine di Spinoza nella prima metà dell'Ottocento tedesco. (Macerata: Quodlibet, 2009) [in Italian]
 Morfino, Vittorio; D'Anna, Giuseppe (eds.): Ontologia e temporalità. Spinoza e nei suoi lettori moderni. (Milano: Mimesis, 2012) [in Italian]
 Nadler, Steven (ed.): Spinoza and Medieval Jewish Philosophy. (Cambridge: Cambridge University Press, 2014) 
 Oittinen, Vesa (ed.): Spinoza im Norden / Spinoza in Nordic Countries [Philosophical Studies from the University of Helsinki]. (Helsinki: University of Helsinki, 2004)
 Olivetti, Marco M.: Lo spinozismo ieri e oggi [Archivio di filosofia]. (Padova: CEDAM, 1978) [in Italian]
 Pereboom, Derk (ed.): The Rationalists: Critical Essays on Descartes, Spinoza, and Leibniz. (Lanham, MD: Rowman & Littlefield, 1999)
 Pozzi, Patrizia: Spinoza, l'eresia della pace: Spinoza e Celan: Lingua, memoria, identità. (Milano: Ghibli, 2005) [in Italian]
 Pozzi, Patrizia (ed.): Spinoza: Amore, cosmopolitismo e tolleranza. (Milano: Mimesis, 2007) [in Italian]
 Ravven, Heidi M.; Goodman, Lenn E. (eds.): Jewish Themes in Spinoza's Philosophy. (Albany, NY: The State University of New York Press, 2002)
 Reuter, Martina; Svensson, Frans (eds.): Mind, Body, and Morality: New Perspectives on Descartes and Spinoza. (London: Routledge, 2019)
 Röhr, Werner (ed.): Spinoza im Osten. Systematische und rezeptionsgeschichtliche Studien. (Berlin: Edition Organon, 2005) [in German]
 Sangiacomo, Andrea; Camera, Francesco (eds.): La ragione della parola. Religione, ermeneutica e linguaggio in Baruch Spinoza. (Padova: Il Prato, 2013) [in Italian]
 Sangiacomo, Andrea; Toto, Francesco (eds.): Essentia actuosa. Riletture dell'etica di Spinoza. (Milano: Mimesis, 2016) [in Italian]
 Sangiacomo, Andrea; Armstrong, Aurelia; Green, Keith (eds.): Spinoza and Relational Autonomy: Being With Others. (Edinburgh: Edinburgh University Press, 2019)
 Schewe, Martin; Engstler, Achim (eds.): Spinoza. (Frankfurt am Main: Peter Lang, 1990) [in German]
 Schnepf, Robert (ed.): Metaphysik im ersten Teil der "Ethik" Spinozas [Schriftenreihe der Spinoza-Gesellschaft; Band 4]. (Würzburg: Königshausen & Neumann, 1996) [in German]
 Schnepf, Robert; Renz, Ursula (eds.): Studia Spinozana, Vol. 16: Spinoza and Late Scholasticism. (Würzburg: Königshausen & Neumann, 2008)
 Schürmann; E.; Waszek, N.; Weinreich, F. (eds.): Spinoza im Deutschland des achtzehnten Jahrhunderts. (Stuttgart: Fromann‐Holzboog, 2002) [in German]
 Schwartz, Daniel B. (ed.): Spinoza's Challenge to Jewish Thought: Writings on His Life, Philosophy, and Legacy. (Waltham, MA: Brandeis University Press, 2019)
 Secrétan, Catherine; Dagron, Tristan; Bove, Laurent (eds.): Qu'est-ce que les Lumières 'radicales'? Libertinage, athéisme et spinozisme dans le tournant de l'âge classique. (Paris: Éditions Amsterdam, 2007) [in French]
 Segura Naya, Armando (ed.): Ser y poder: Spinoza y los fundamentos del laicismo moderno. (Granada: Universidad de Granada, 2010) [in Spanish]
 Senn, Marcel; Walther, Manfred (eds.): Ethik, Recht und Politik bei Spinoza. (Zürich: Schulthess Verlag, 2001) [in German]
 Sévérac, Pascal; Martins, André (eds.): Spinoza et la psychanalyse. Préface de Pierre-François Moreau. (Paris: Hermann Editeurs, 2012) [in French]
 Sévérac, Pascal; Sauvagnargues, Anne (eds.): Spinoza–Deleuze: lectures croisées [La croisée des chemins]. (Lyon: ENS Éditions, 2016) [in French]
 Shanan, Robert; Biro, J.I. (eds.): Spinoza: New Perspectives. (Norman, OK: University of Oklahoma Press, 1978)
 Sharp, Hasana; Smith, Jason E. (eds.): Between Hegel and Spinoza: A Volume of Critical Essays. (New York: Bloomsbury Academic, 2012)
 Solé, María Jimena (ed.): Spinoza en debate. (Buenos Aires: Miño y Dávila, 2015)  [in Spanish]
 Solé, María Jimena; Gaudio, Mariano Lucas; Ferreyra, Diego Julián; et al. (eds.): Los caminos cruzados de Spinoza, Fichte y Deleuze. (Buenos Aires: RAGIF Ediciones, 2018) [in Spanish]
 Sonntag, Leo; Stolte, Heinz (eds.): Spinoza in neuer Sicht. (Meisenheim/Glan: Anton Hain, 1977) [in German]
 Tatián, Diego (ed.): Las aventuras de la inmanencia. Ensayos sobre Spinoza. (Córdoba, Argentina: Cuadernos de Nombres, 2002) [in Spanish]
 Tatián, Diego (ed.): Spinoza: Primer Coloquio [Círculo Spinoziano de la Argentina]. (Buenos Aires: Altamira, 2005) [in Spanish]
 Tatián, Diego (ed.): Spinoza: Segundo Coloquio [Círculo Spinoziano de la Argentina]. (Buenos Aires: Altamira, 2005) [in Spanish]
 Tatián, Diego (ed.): Spinoza: Tercer Coloquio [Círculo Spinoziano de la Argentina]. (Córdoba, Argentina: Editorial Brujas, 2007) [in Spanish]
 Tatián, Diego (ed.): Spinoza: Cuarto Coloquio [Círculo Spinoziano de la Argentina]. (Córdoba, Argentina: Editorial Brujas, 2008) [in Spanish]
 Tatián, Diego (ed.): Spinoza: Quinto Coloquio [Círculo Spinoziano de la Argentina]. (Córdoba, Argentina: Editorial Brujas, 2009) [in Spanish]
 Tatián, Diego (ed.): Spinoza: Sexto Coloquio [Círculo Spinoziano de la Argentina]. (Córdoba, Argentina: Editorial Brujas, 2010) [in Spanish]
 Tatián, Diego (ed.): Spinoza: Séptimo Coloquio [Círculo Spinoziano de la Argentina]. (Córdoba, Argentina: Editorial Brujas, 2011) [in Spanish]
 Tatián, Diego (ed.): Spinoza: Octavo Coloquio [Círculo Spinoziano de la Argentina]. (Córdoba, Argentina: Editorial Brujas, 2012) [in Spanish]
 Tatián, Diego (ed.): Spinoza: Noveno Coloquio [Círculo Spinoziano de la Argentina]. (Córdoba, Argentina: Editorial Brujas, 2013) [in Spanish]
 Van Bunge, Wiep; Klever, Wim (eds.): Disguised and Overt Spinozism around 1700. Papers Presented at the International Colloquium, held at Rotterdam, 5–8 October 1994. (Leiden: Brill, 1995)
 Van Bunge, Wiep (ed.): Studia Spinozana, Vol. 15: Spinoza and Dutch Cartesianism. (Würzburg: Königshausen & Neumann, 2006)
 Van Bunge, Wiep (ed.): Spinoza Past and Present: Essays on Spinoza, Spinozism, and Spinoza Scholarship. (Leiden: Brill, 2012) 
 Van der Bend, J.G. (ed.): Spinoza on Knowing, Being and Freedom: Proceedings of the Spinoza Symposium at the International School of Philosophy in the Netherlands, Leiden, September 1973. (Assen: Van Gorcum, 1974)
 Van Heertum, Cis (ed.): Libertas philosophandi: Spinoza als gids voor een vrije wereld. (Amsterdam: In de Pelikaan, 2008) [in Dutch]
 Vardoulakis, Dimitris (ed.): Spinoza Now. (Minneapolis: University of Minnesota Press, 2011)
 Vinciguerra, Lorenzo (ed.): Quel avenir pour Spinoza? Enquête sur les spinozismes à venir. (Paris: Kimé, 2001) [in French]
 Waibel, Violetta L. (ed.): Affektenlehre und amor Dei intellectualis. Die Rezeption Spinozas im Deutschen Idealismus, in der Frühromantik und in der Gegenwart. (Hamburg: Meiner Verlag, 2012) [in German]
 Walther, Manfred; Matheron, Alexandre; Giancotti, Emilia (eds.): Studia Spinozana, Vol. 1: Spinoza's Philosophy of Society. (Alling, Germany: Walther & Walther, 1985)
 Walther, Manfred; Bertman, M.; De Dijn, Herman (eds.): Studia Spinozana, Vol. 3: Spinoza and Hobbes. (Alling, Germany: Walther & Walther, 1987)
 Walther, Manfred; Curley, Edwin; Heinekamp, A. (eds.): Studia Spinozana, Vol. 6: Spinoza and Leibniz. (Würzburg: Königshausen & Neumann, 1990) 
 Walther, Manfred; Klever, Wim; Moreau, Pierre-François (eds.): Studia Spinozana, Vol. 7: Ethics in the "Ethics". (Würzburg: Königshausen & Neumann, 1991)
 Walther, Manfred; Balibar, Étienne; Seidel, Helmut (eds.): Studia Spinozana, Vol. 8: Spinoza's Psychology and Social Psychology. (Würzburg: Königshausen & Neumann, 1992)
 Walther, Manfred (ed.): Spinoza und der deutsche Idealismus [Schriftenreihe der Spinoza-Gesellschaft; Band 1]. (Würzburg: Königshausen & Neumann, 1992) [in German]
 Walther, Manfred; Balibar, Étienne; Seidel, Helmut (eds.): Studia Spinozana, Vol. 9: Spinoza and Modernity: Ethics and Politics. (Würzburg: Königshausen & Neumann, 1993)
 Walther, Manfred; Nadler, Steven; Yakira, Elhanan (eds.): Studia Spinozana, Vol. 13: Spinoza and Jewish Identity. (Würzburg: Königshausen & Neumann, 2003)
 Walther, Manfred; Englisch, Felicitas; Lauermann, Manfred; Schröder, Maria-Brigitta (eds.): Randfiguren: Spinoza-Inspirationen. Festgabe für Manfred Walther. (Hannover-Laatzen: Wehrhahn, 2005) [in German]
 Wetlesen, Jon (ed.):  Spinoza Bibliography: Particularly on the Period 1940–1967. (Oslo: Universitetsforlaget, 1968)
 Wetlesen, Jon (ed.):  Spinoza's Philosophy of Man: Proceedings of the Scandinavian Spinoza Symposium 1977. (Oslo: Universitetsforlaget, 1978)
 Wilbur, James B. (ed.): Spinoza's Metaphysics: Essays in Critical Appreciation. (Assen, The Netherlands: Van Gorcum, 1976)
 Yovel, Yirmiyahu (ed.): God and Nature: Spinoza's Metaphysics: Papers Presented at the First Jerusalem Conference (Ethica I). (Leiden: Brill, 1991)
 Yovel, Yirmiyahu; Segal, Gideon (eds.): Spinoza on Knowledge and the Human Mind: Papers Presented at the Second Jerusalem Conference (Ethica II). (Leiden: Brill, 1994)
 Yovel, Yirmiyahu (ed.): Desire and Affect: Spinoza as Psychologist: Papers Presented at the Third Jerusalem Conference (Ethica III). (New York: Little Room Press, 1999)
 Yovel, Yirmiyahu; Segal, Gideon (eds.): Spinoza on Reason and the "Free Man": Papers Presented at the Fourth Jerusalem Conference (Ethica IV). (New York: Little Room Press, 2004)

Journals of Spinoza studiesChronicon Spinozanum (journal)Bulletin de bibliographie spinoziste [in French]Bulletin de l'Association des Amis de Spinoza [in French]Cahiers Spinoza [in French]Bollettino dell'Associazione italiana degli Amici di Spinoza [in Italian]Boletín de bibliografía spinozista [in Spanish]Círculo Spinoziano: Revista de Filosofía [in Spanish]Cuadernos del Seminario Spinoza [in Spanish]Cadernos Espinosanos: Estudos sobre o século XVII [in Portuguese]Revista Conatus: Filosofia de Spinoza North American Spinoza Society NewsletterTravaux et documents du Groupe de Recherches Spinozistes [in French]

Journal articles, scholarly papers
Spinoza's influence upon the literary world
Beyond philosophy, Spinoza was one of few pure philosophers who exerts a profound influence on many notable literary writers (i.e. poets and fiction authors) in history, including Matthew Arnold, Machado de Assis, Berthold Auerbach, John Berger, Harold Bloom, Jorge Luis Borges, Paul Celan, Samuel Taylor Coleridge, George Eliot, T. S. Eliot, Ralph Waldo Emerson, Gustave Flaubert, Jostein Gaarder, Johann Wolfgang von Goethe, Rebecca Goldstein, Guo Moruo, Heinrich Heine, Zbigniew Herbert, Friedrich Hölderlin, Aldous Huxley, Gotthold Ephraim Lessing, Bernard Malamud, Herman Melville, Elsa Morante, Novalis, Pier Paolo Pasolini, Sully Prudhomme, Romain Rolland, Solomon Rubin, Friedrich Schlegel, Percy Bysshe Shelley, Isaac Bashevis Singer, Goce Smilevski, Hippolyte Taine, Miguel de Unamuno, P. G. Wodehouse, William Wordsworth, Irvin D. Yalom, and Louis Zukofsky.

 Abadi, Marcelo (1989), 'Spinoza in Borges' looking-glass,'. Studia Spinozana: An International and Interdisciplinary Series 5: 29–42  
 Armstrong, Isobel (2013), 'George Eliot, Spinoza, and the Emotions,'. in: A Companion to George Eliot, edited by Amanda Anderson and Harry E. Shaw. (New York: Wiley-Blackwell, 2013), pp. 294–308
 Azoulai, Juliette (2019), 'Flaubert, sur les ailes de Spinoza,'. Bulletin de la section française de la Faculté des Lettres, Université Rikkyo, Tokyo, Japon, 2019, Flaubert et Lamartine : archéologie de la modernité littéraire, Norioki Sugaya (dir.), pp. 9–28 [in French]
 Berkeley, Richard (2006), 'The Providential Wreck: Coleridge and Spinoza's Metaphysics,'. European Romantic Review 17(4): 457–475. 
 Botting, Eileen Hunt (2019), 'Mary Shelley's ‘Romantic Spinozism’,'. History of European Ideas 45(8):1125–1142. 
 Brown, Andrew (1996), '"Un Assez Vague Spinozisme": Flaubert and Spinoza,'. The Modern Language Review 91(4): 848–865
 Crowther, Louise (2009), 'Freedom and Necessity: Spinoza's Impact on Lessing,'. German Life and Letters 62(4): 359–377.  
 Gatens, Moira (2012), 'Compelling Fictions: Spinoza and George Eliot on Imagination and Belief,'. European Journal of Philosophy 20(1): 74–90. 
 Gatens, Moira (2019), 'Frankenstein, Spinoza, and exemplarity,'. Textual Practice  33(5): 739–752. 
 Goetschel, Willi (2003), 'Heine's Spinoza,'. Idealistic Studies 33(2/3): 203–217  
 Goldstein, Rebecca (2017), 'Literary Spinoza,'. In: The Oxford Handbook of Spinoza, edited by Michael Della Rocca. (Oxford University Press, 2017), pp. 627–667
 Gyergai, Albert (1971), 'Flaubert et Spinoza,'. Les Amis de Flaubert 39: 11–22. [in French]
 Halmi, Nicholas (2012), 'Coleridge's Ecumenical Spinoza,'. In: Spinoza beyond Philosophy, edited by Beth Lord. (Edinburgh: Edinburgh University Press, 2012), pp. 187–207
 Heydt-Stevenson, Jillian; Hessel, Kurtis (2016), 'Queen Mab, Wollstonecraft, and Spinoza Teaching "Nature's Primal Modesty",'. European Romantic Review 27(3): 351–363. 
 Kristal, Efraín (2007), 'Unrequited Sublimations: Borges Reads Spinoza,'. Romanic Review 98: 225–236
 Levinson, Marjorie (2007), 'A Motion and a Spirit: Romancing Spinoza,'. Studies in Romanticism 46(4): 367–408.  
 Metzger, Lore (1960), 'Coleridge's Vindication of Spinoza: An Unpublished Note,'. Journal of the History of Ideas 21(2): 279–293.  
 Ogden, Mark R. (1989), 'Amor dei intellectualis: Hölderlin, Spinoza and St. John,'. Deutsche Vierteljahrsschrift für Literaturwissenschaft Und Geistesgeschichte 63(3): 420–60. 
 Santinelli, Cristina (2013), '"La fête du trésor caché": Spinoza dans la poétique d'Elsa Morante,'. Philonsorbonne 7: 147–167. [in French]
 Schings, Hans-Jürgen (1986), 'Goethe's ‘Wilhelm Meister’ and Spinoza,'. Interdisciplinary Science Reviews 11(2): 118–121. 
 Smith, Steven B. (2002), 'A Fool for Love: Thoughts on I. B. Singer's Spinoza,'. Iyyun: The Jerusalem Philosophical Quarterly 51: 41–50. 
 Spector, Stanley J. (2005), 'Coleridge's Misreading of Spinoza,'. In: The Jews and British Romanticism: Politics, Religion, Culture, edited by Sheila A. Spector. (New York: Palgrave Macmillan, 2005), pp 233–244
 Strawser, Michael (2019), 'The true Spinoza of Market Street,'. Textual Practice 33(5): 753–770. 
 Uhlmann, Anthony (2019), 'Spinoza, aesthetics, and Percy Shelley's ‘A Defence of Poetry’,'. Textual Practice 33(5): 721–738 
 Vermorel, Henri (2007), 'Présence de Spinoza dans les échanges entre Romain Rolland et Sigmund Freud'. (Conférence prononcée à Paris en Sorbonne salle Louis Liard, le 31 mai 2007) [in French]
 Winkler, Sean (2013), 'The Novel of Spinozism: An Introduction,'. Acta Universitatis Carolinae Interpretationes: Studia Philosophica Europeanea 3(2): 129–142

Spinoza and Spinozism in history
 Beiser, Frederick C. (1987), 'Rise of Spinozism in Germany, 1680–1786,'. In: Frederick C. Beiser, The Fate of Reason: German Philosophy from Kant to Fichte. (Cambridge, MA: Harvard University Press, 1987), pp. 48– 
 Beiser, Frederick C. (1987), 'The Dispute over Lessing's Spinozism,'. In: Frederick C. Beiser, The Fate of Reason: German Philosophy from Kant to Fichte. (Cambridge, MA: Harvard University Press, 1987), pp. 61– 
 Beiser, Frederick C. (1987), 'The Critique of Spinozism and Purified Pantheism,'. In: Frederick C. Beiser, The Fate of Reason: German Philosophy from Kant to Fichte. (Cambridge, MA: Harvard University Press, 1987), pp. 102– 
 Beistegui, Miguel de (2005), 'The Vertigo of Immanence: Deleuze's Spinozism,'. Research in Phenomenology 35(1): 77–100 
 Bell, Jeffrey (2011), 'Between Realism and Anti-Realism: Deleuze and the Spinozist Tradition in Philosophy,'. Deleuze and Guatarri Studies 5(1): 1–17
 Bowman, Brady (2018), 'Autonomy, Negativity, and the Challenge of Spinozism in Hegel's Science of Logic,'. Journal of the History of Philosophy 56 (1): 101–126 
 Cerrato, Francesco (2008), 'Espressione, univocità e nozioni comuni. Lo spinozismo novecentesco di Deleuze,'. In: Canone Deleuze. La storia della filosofia come divenire del pensiero. (Bologna: Clinamen, 2008), pp. 81–95 [in Italian]
 Citton, Yves (2007), 'ConcateNations: Globalization in a Spinozist Context,'. In: Diane Morgan, Gary Bantham (eds.), Cosmopolitics and the Emergence of a Future. (New York: Palgrave Macmillan, 2007), pp. 91–117
 De Dijn, Herman (1987), 'Negri's Spinozism: a new philosophy of liberation?,'. Bijdragen: International Journal for Philosophy and Theology 48(1): 41–51.  
 Diefenbach, Katja (2016), 'Is it simple to be a Spinozist in philosophy? Althusser and Deleuze,'. Radical Philosophy 199 (Sept/Oct 2016)
 Duffy, Simon B. (2009), 'Spinoza Today: The Current State of Spinoza Scholarship,'. Intellectual History Review 19(1): 111–132. 
 Duffy, Simon B. (2014), 'French and Italian Spinozism,'. In: Rosi Braidotti (ed.), After Poststructuralism: Transitions and Transformations. (London: Routledge, 2014), p. 148–168
 Freudenthal, Jacob (1895), 'On the History of Spinozism,'. The Jewish Quarterly Review VIII: 44–46
 Giovanni, George di (2005), 'Hegel's Anti-Spinozism : The Transition to Subjective Logic and the End of Classical Metaphysics,'. In: David Carlson (ed.), Hegel's Theory of the Subject. (Palgrave-Macmillan, 2005)
 Israel, Jonathan I. (2018), 'Spinoza and Spinozism in the Western Enlightenment: the Latest Turns in the Controversy,'. Araucaria. Revista Iberoamericana de Filosofía, Política, Humanidades y Relaciones Internacionales, nº 40: 41–57. 
 Jakuszko, Honorata (2009), 'The Spinoza Inspiration in the Late German Enlightenment (Spätaufklärung),'. Studies in Logic, Grammar and Rhetoric 15(29): 173–189
 Kelly, Michael R. (2014), 'The Uses and Abuses of Husserl's Doctrine of Immanence: The Specter of Spinozism in Phenomenology's Theological Turn,'. Heythrop Journal 55(4): 553–564 
 Knappik, Franz (2015), 'Hegel's modal argument against Spinozism. An interpretation of the chapter ‘Actuality’ in the Science of Logic,'. Hegel Bulletin 36(1): 53–79 
 Lamm, Julia A. (1994), 'Schleiermacher's Post-Kantian Spinozism: The Early Essays on Spinoza, 1793–94,'. The Journal of Religion 74(4): 476–505 
 Lilti, Antoine (2009), 'Comment écrit-on l'histoire intellectuelle des Lumières? Spinozisme, radicalisme et philosophie,'. Annales: Histoire, Sciences Sociales 64(1): 171–206 [in French]
 Lord, Beth (2009), 'Against the Fanaticism of Forces: Kant's Critique of Herder's Spinozism,'. Parallax 15(2): 53–68
 Maidansky, Andrey (2003), 'The Russian Spinozists,'. Studies in East European Thought 5(3): 199–216
 Marshall, Colin (2012), 'Spinoza on Destroying Passions with Reason,'. Philosophy and Phenomenological Research 85(1): 139–160
 Matysik, Tracie (2016), 'Writing the History of Spinozism,'. History and Theory 55(3): 401–417 (2016)
 Melamed, Yitzhak Y. (2004), 'Salomon Maimon and the Rise of Spinozism in German Idealism,'. Journal of the History of Philosophy 42(1): 67–96
 Melamed, Yitzhak Y. (2011), 'Spinoza's Anti-humanism: An Outline,'. In: The Rationalists: Between Tradition and Innovation, edited by Carlos Fraenkel, Dario Perinetti, and Justin E. H. Smith. (New York: Springer, 2011), pp. 147–166
 Newlands, Samuel (2016), 'Backing into Spinozism,'. Philosophy and Phenomenological Research 93(3): 511–537 
 Parkinson, G. H. R. (1993), 'Spinoza and British Idealism: The Case of H. H. Joachim,'. British Journal for the History of Philosophy 1(2): 109–123
 Preposiet, J. (1977), 'Remarks on the Doctrine of Double Necessity in Spinozism,'. Revue Internationale de Philosophie 31 (119): 135–144
 Ravven, Heidi M. (2003), 'Spinoza's Anticipation of Contemporary Affective Neuroscience,'. Consciousness & Emotion 4(2): 257–290
 Sprigge, T.L.S. (1995), 'Is Spinozism a Religion?,'. Studia Spinozana: An International and Interdisciplinary Series 11: 137–164 
 Stern, Robert (2015), 'Hegelianism vs. Spinozism? A. W. Moore on Hegel,'. Philosophical Topics 43(1–2): 97–112 
 Toassa, Gisele; Oliveira, Fernando Bonadia de (2018), 'Vygotsky's Anomalous Spinozism,'. Mind, Culture, and Activity 25(4): 378–390.  
 Toscano, Alberto (2005), 'The Politics of Spinozism: Composition and Communication'. Paper presented at the Cultural Research Bureau of Iran, Tehran, 4 January 2005
 Van Bunge, Wiep (2009), 'Scholarly Spinozism in the Netherlands and Flanders,'. Tijdschrift Voor Filosofie 71(1): 11–36
 Vinciguerra, Lorenzo (2009), 'Spinoza in French Philosophy Today,'. Philosophy Today 53(4): 422–437. 
 Ward, Christopher (2002), 'Spinozism and Kant's Transcendental Ideal,'. Idealistic Studies 32(3): 221–236
 Wasser, Audrey (2012), 'A Relentless Spinozism: Deleuze's Encounter with Beckett,'. Substance 41(1): 124–136 
 Wertheim, David J. (2016), 'The Pantheismusstreit and the Spiritualization of Spinozism,'. Religion and Theology 23(1–2): 148–160

Literary works (e.g. poetry and fiction)
 Aillaud, Gilles: Vermeer et Spinoza. (Paris: Christian Bourgois Éditeur, 1987) [in French]
 Ali, Tariq: The Trials of Spinoza. (London: Seagull Books, 2011)
 Amador, Philippe: Spinoza à la recherche de la vérité et du bonheur. Le Traité de la réforme de l'entendement. (Paris: Dunod, 2019) [in French]
 Angelillo, Giuseppe D'Ambrosio: Spinoza se ne va in Terra Santa. (Milano: Acquaviva, 2009) [in Italian]
 Ánjel Rendo, José Guillermo: Entendimiento, la novela de Spinoza. (Medellín: Editorial Universidad Pontificia Bolivariana, 2008) [in Spanish]
 Auerbach, Berthold: Spinoza: Ein historischer Roman. (Stuttgart: J. Scheible's Buchhandlung, 1837) [in German]
 Auerbach, Berthold: Spinoza: Ein Denkerleben. (Mannheim: Wassermann & Mathy, 1854; Altenmünster: Jazzybee Verlag Jürgen Beck, 2012) [in German]
 Beekes, Jaron: De lens van Spinoza. (Amsterdam: Oog & Blik, 2011) [in Dutch]
 Berger, John: Bento's Sketchbook. (New York: Pantheon Books, 2011)
 Block, Lawrence: The Burglar Who Studied Spinoza. (Harpenden, Herts: No Exit Press, 1993)
 Block, Lawrence: La Spinoza connection. Traduit de l'américain par Robert Pépin. (Paris: Seuil, 1998) [in French]
 Borges, Jorge Luis: Baruch Spinoza and Spinoza (2 poems) [in Spanish]
 Bukharin, Nikolai: Amor Dei Intellectualis (1937 poem) [in Russian]
 Cappagli, Alice: Niente caffè per Spinoza. (Torino: Giulio Einaudi Editore, 2019) [in Italian]
 Commère, Pascal: Les larmes de Spinoza. (Paris: Le Temps qu'il fait, 2009) [in French]
 Einstein, Albert: Zu Spinozas Ethik (1920 poem) [in German]
 Gaarder, Jostein: Sofies verden: Roman om filosofiens historie. (Oslo: H. Aschehoug & Co., 1991) [in Norwegian]
 Gaarder, Jostein: Sophie's World: A Novel About the History of Philosophy. Translated from the Norwegian by Paulette Møller. (New York: Farrar, Straus and Giroux, 1994)
 Guo, Moruo: San ge Fanshenlun Zhe [Three Pantheists] (1919 poem) [in Chinese]
 Herbert, Zbigniew: Pan Cogito opowiada o kuszeniu Spinozy [Mr. Cogito Tells about the Temptation of Spinoza] (poem) [in Polish]
 Herbert, Zbigniew: Łóżko Spinozy [Spinoza's Bed] (short story) [in Polish]
 Huxley, Aldous: Spinoza's Worm Ives, David: New Jerusalem: The interrogation of Baruch de Spinoza at Talmud Torah Congregation: Amsterdam, 27 July 1656. (New York City: Dramatists Play Service, Inc., 2009)
 Klein, A.M.: Out of the Pulver and the Polished Lens (1931 poem)
 Kolbenheyer, Erwin Guido: Amor Dei: Ein Spinoza-Roman. (München: G. Müller, 1908) [in German]
 Kolbenheyer, Erwin Guido: God-Intoxicated Man. Translated from the German by John Linton. (London: Ivor Nicholson & Watson, 1933)
 Mudd, Harvey: Spinoza's Dog: New and Selected Poems. (The Porcupine Press, 2017)
 Pavone, Gianfranco: Le lacrime di Spinoza. (Messina: Di Nicolò Edizioni, 2015) [in Italian]
 Rolland, Romain: L'éclair de Spinoza. (Paris: Le Sablier, 1931) [in French]
 Rovère, Maxime: Le Clan Spinoza. Amsterdam, 1677. L'invention de la liberté. (Paris: Édition Flammarion, 2017) [in French]
 Rovère, Maxime: Spinozaland: De ontdekking van de vrijheid – Amsterdam, 1677. Vertaald uit het Frans door Hendrickje Spoor. (Amsterdam: Uitgeverij Balans, 2019) [in Dutch]
 Rovère, Maxime: Tutte le vite di Spinoza. Amsterdam 1677: l'invenzione della libertà. Traduzione di Alessandro Ciappa. (Milano: Feltrinelli, 2020) [in Italian]
 Schecroun, Jacques: Le Procès de Spinoza. (Paris: Albin Michel, 2021) [in French]
 Singer, Isaac Bashevis: Der Spinozist: Dertseylung [The Spinoza of Market Street] (1944 fiction) [in German]
 Smilevski, Goce: Разговор со Спиноза [Razgovor so Spinoza]. (Skopje: Kultura, 2003) [in Macedonian]
 Smilevski, Goce: Conversation with Spinoza: A Cobweb Novel. Translated from the Macedonian by Filip Korszenski. (Evanston, IL: Northwestern University Press, 2006) 
 Smilevski, Goce: Il sogno di Spinoza. Traduzione di Davide Fanciullo. (Parma: Guanda, 2014) [in Italian]
 Smilevski, Goce: Gespräch mit Spinoza. Aus dem Mazedonischen von Benjamin Langer. (Berlin: Matthes & Seitz, 2016) [in German]
 Smilevski, Goce: Dünyanın Başladığı Pencere: Spinoza'nın Bilinmeyen Öyküsü, çev. Ayşe Beyza Artukarslan. (İstanbul: Nora Kitap, 2019) [in Turkish]
 Susser, Bernard: The Spinoza Quartet (2013 novel)
 Teissier, Jacques: Le cauchemar de Spinoza. (Paris: Le Manuscrit, 2010) [in French]
 Yalom, Irvin D.: The Spinoza Problem: A Novel. (New York: Basic Books, 2012)
 Yalom, Irvin D.: Het raadsel Spinoza. (Amsterdam: Balans, 2012) [in Dutch]
 Yalom, Irvin D.: Le Problème Spinoza. Traduit de l'anglais (États-Unis) par Sylvette Gleize. (Paris: Édition Galaade, 2012) [in French]
 Yalom, Irvin D.: Das Spinoza-Problem: Roman. (München: Random House GmbH, 2012) [in German]
 Yalom, Irvin D.: Il problema Spinoza. (Vicenza: Neri Pozza Editore, 2012) [in Italian]
 Yalom, Irvin D.: Spinoza Problemi: Bir Nazi Subayının Paradoksu, çev. Ahmet Ergenç. (İstanbul: Kabalcı Yayınevi, 2012) [in Turkish]
 Yalom, Irvin D.: El problema de Spinoza. Traducción de José Manuel Álvarez-Flórez. (Barcelona: Ediciones Destino, 2013) [in Spanish]
 Yalom, Irvin D.: O Problema Espinosa. [Trad. João Henrique Pinto]. (S. Pedro do Estoril: Saída de Emergência, 2013) [in Portuguese]
 Zangwill, Israel: The Lens Grinder (play)

Films and stage plays
 Spinoza: The Apostle of Reason (1994 film by Tariq Ali and Christopher Spencer)
 New Jerusalem: The Interrogation of Baruch de Spinoza at Talmud Torah Congregation: Amsterdam, 27 July 1656 (2008 play by David Ives)
 Spinoza, een vrije denker (2015 documentary film by Robin Lutz) [in Dutch]
 Ethica – Natura e origine della mente (2017 theatrical action by Romeo Castellucci) [in Italian]

Audio (e.g. lectures)
 Bragg, Melvyn: In Our Time: Spinoza (BBC Radio 4, 2007)
 Deleuze, Gilles: Spinoza: Immortalité et éternité [2 CD; coll. «À voix haute»]. (Paris: Éditions Gallimard, 2001) [in French]
 Deleuze, Gilles: Spinoza: The Velocities of Thought: Lecture 1, 2 December 1980. (Purdue University Research Repository, 2017) 	
 Deleuze, Gilles: Spinoza: The Velocities of Thought: Lecture 2, 9 December 1980. (Purdue University Research Repository, 2017) 	
 Deleuze, Gilles: Spinoza: The Velocities of Thought: Lecture 3, 16 December 1980. (Purdue University Research Repository, 2017) 
 Deleuze, Gilles: Spinoza: The Velocities of Thought: Lecture 4, 6 January 1981. (Purdue University Research Repository, 2017) 
 Deleuze, Gilles: Spinoza: The Velocities of Thought: Lecture 5, 13 January 1981. (Purdue University Research Repository, 2017) 
 Deleuze, Gilles: Spinoza: The Velocities of Thought: Lecture 6, 20 January 1981. (Purdue University Research Repository, 2017) 	
 Deleuze, Gilles: Spinoza: The Velocities of Thought: Lecture 7, 27 January 1981. (Purdue University Research Repository, 2017) 	
 Deleuze, Gilles: Spinoza: The Velocities of Thought: Lecture 8, 3 February 1981. (Purdue University Research Repository, 2017) 	
 Deleuze, Gilles: Spinoza: The Velocities of Thought: Lecture 9, 10 February 1981. (Purdue University Research Repository, 2017) 	
 Deleuze, Gilles: Spinoza: The Velocities of Thought: Lecture 10, 17 February 1981. (Purdue University Research Repository, 2017) 	
 Deleuze, Gilles: Spinoza: The Velocities of Thought: Lecture 11, 10 March 1981. (Purdue University Research Repository, 2017) 
 Deleuze, Gilles: Spinoza: The Velocities of Thought: Lecture 12, 17 March 1981. (Purdue University Research Repository, 2017) 	
 Deleuze, Gilles: Spinoza: The Velocities of Thought: Lecture 13, 24 March 1981. (Purdue University Research Repository, 2017) 	
 Deleuze, Gilles: Spinoza: The Velocities of Thought: Lecture 14, 31 March 1981. (Purdue University Research Repository, 2017) . «Spinoza: The Velocities of Thought» («Spinoza: Des vitesses de la pensée») was a 14-lecture seminar given by Deleuze at the University of Paris 8 from December 1980 to March 1981. In this seminar, Deleuze revisits his examination of Spinoza's philosophy. Deleuze had previously published two books on Spinoza, Expressionism in Philosophy: Spinoza (Spinoza et le problème de l'expression, 1968), and Spinoza: Practical Philosophy (Spinoza: Philosophie pratique'', 1970, 2nd ed. 1981). The majority of these lectures were given the same year as the publication of the second edition of the latter title.

See also
 Cultural depictions of Baruch Spinoza

References

Works about Baruch Spinoza
Spinoza studies
Spinoza
Spinoza